= 1971 New Year Honours =

British royal recognitions

The New Year Honours 1971 were appointments in many of the Commonwealth realms of Queen Elizabeth II to various orders and honours to reward and highlight good works by citizens of those countries. They were announced in supplements to the London Gazette of 31 December 1970 to celebrate the year passed and mark the beginning of 1971.

At this time honours for Australians were awarded both in the United Kingdom honours, on the advice of the premiers of Australian states, and also in a separate Australia honours list.

The recipients of honours are displayed here as they were styled before their new honour, and arranged by honour, with classes (Knight, Knight Grand Cross, etc.) and then divisions (Military, Civil, etc.) as appropriate.

== United Kingdom and Commonwealth ==
=== Baron ===
Life Peer

- Sir Charles Hector Fitzroy Maclean, Bt., KT, KBE, Chief Scout of the Commonwealth.
- The Right Honourable Sir Jocelyn Edward Salis Simon, President of the Probate, Divorce and Admiralty Division of the High Court of Justice.
- Sir (William) Miles Webster Thomas, DFC, President and lately Chairman, National Savings Committee.

=== Privy Counsellor ===
- The Honourable Sir Cyril Ambrose Walsh, KBE, a Justice of the High Court of Australia.

=== Knight Bachelor ===
- William Melville Arnott, TD, FRCP (Ed.), William Withering Professor of Medicine, University of Birmingham.
- Maurice Alfred Lister Banks. For services to Patent Law.
- David Haven Barran, Chairman, Shell Transport and Trading Co. Ltd.
- Raymond Percival Brookes, Chairman and Chief Executive, Guest Keen and Nettlefolds Ltd. For services to Export.
- Leslie Cannon, CBE, General President, Electrical, Electronic, Telecommunications and Plumbing Union. (Died 9 December 1970 after the Honour was approved.)
- Henry Frederick Ross Catherwood, Director-General, National Economic Development Office.
- Henry Chisholm, CBE, Chairman, Corby Development Corporation.
- Alan Howard Cottrell, Deputy Chief Scientific Adviser to the Government.
- Cyril Thomas Cripps, MBE. For public and charitable services.
- Professor Frederick Sydney Dainton. For services to Science and Higher Education.
- George Edward Raven Deacon, CBE, Director, National Institute of Oceanography.
- Gerald Alfred Glover. For political and public services.
- Francis Frederick Griffin, Alderman, Birmingham City Council.
- Adrian Lincoln Hallinan, DL. For local government and public services in Cardiff.
- John Wyndham Pope-Hennessy, CBE. For services to Fine Art.
- William Aylsham Bryan Hopkin, CBE, Deputy Chief Economic Adviser, HM Treasury.
- Cyril Hugh Kleinwort, Chairman, Committee on Invisible Exports.
- Donald Ross Liddle, DL, Lord Provost of the City of Glasgow.
- Wylie McKissock, OBE, MS, FRCS, Neurological Surgeon.
- Henry Stenhouse Mance, Chairman of Lloyd's.
- Frank Shaw Marshall, Alderman, Leeds City Council.
- Stirrat Andrew William Johnson-Marshall, CBE, Senior Partner, Robert Matthew Johnson Marshall and Partners.
- Douglas Osmond, CBE, QPM, Chief Constable, Hampshire Constabulary.
- Denys Lionel Page, Regius Professor of Greek, University of Cambridge.
- The Right Honourable Robert Wilson Porter, QC, MP, Minister of Home Affairs, Government of Northern Ireland, 1969–70.
- Humphrey Povah Treverbian Prideaux, OBE, Chairman, Navy, Army and Air Force Institutes.
- William Clark Ramsay, CBE. For services to Rugby Football.
- Alexander Ross, lately Chairman, East European Trade Council. For services to Export.
- The Honourable Marcus Joseph Sieff, OBE, Joint Managing Director, Marks & Spencer Ltd. For services to Export.

Diplomatic Service and Overseas List

- William Gordon Bryce, CBE, QC, Chief Justice, Bahama Islands.
- The Honourable Mr. Justice William Algernon Holwell Duffus, President, Court of Appeal for East Africa.
- The Honourable Kenneth Fung Ping-fan, CBE. For public and social services in Hong Kong.
- Rupert Godfrey John, Governor of Saint Vincent.

State of New South Wales

- The Honourable Asher Alexander Joel, OBE. For services to the community.
- Matthew John O'Neill, CBE. For services to commerce and charity.
- Raymond Edgar Purves, CBE. For services to the community.

State of Victoria

- Charles Roger Darvall, CBE, of Toorak. For public service.
- Professor Sydney Lance Townsend, VRD, MD, FRCS, of Hawthorn East. Professor of Obstetrics and Gynaecology, University of Melbourne.

State of Queensland

- The Honourable Harold Richter, of Brisbane. For outstanding public services.

State of Western Australia

- Norman Brearley, CBE, DSO, MC, AFC. For services to aviation.
- Reginald Fielding Rushton, of Perth. For outstanding service to the community.

State of Tasmania

- The Honourable Alfred John White, Agent-General for Tasmania in London.

=== Order of the Bath ===
==== Knight Grand Cross of the Order of the Bath (GCB) ====
Military Division

- Admiral Sir Michael Patrick Pollock, KCB, MVO, DSC.
- General Sir Desmond Fitzpatrick, KCB, DSO, MBE, MC, ADC (Gen.), (53670) late Royal Armoured Corps, Deputy Colonel The Blues and Royals.
- Air Chief Marshal Sir Denis Spotswood, KCB, CBE, DSO, DFC, ADC, Royal Air Force.

Civil Division

- Sir George Edward Godber, KCB, DM, FRCP, Chief Medical Officer, Department of Health and Social Security, Department of Education and Science, and Home Office.

==== Knight Commander of the Order of the Bath (KCB) ====
Military Division

- Admiral Edward Beckwith Ashmore, CB, DSC.
- Vice-Admiral Andrew Mackenzie Lewis, CB.
- Lieutenant-General William Godfrey Fothergill Jackson, OBE, MC, (73056), late Corps of Royal Engineers.
- Lieutenant-General Richard Erskine Ward, CB, DSO, MC, (73199), late Royal Armoured Corps, Colonel Commandant Royal Tank Regiment.
- Air Marshal William Derek Hodgkinson, CB, CBE, DFC, AFC, Royal Air Force.
- Air Marshal Harold Brownlow Martin, CB, DSO, DFC, AFC, Royal Air Force.

Civil Division

- William Dennis Pile, CB, MBE, Permanent Under-Secretary of State, Department of Education and Science.

==== Companion of the Order of the Bath (CB) ====
Military Division

Royal Navy

- Rear Admiral Charles Courtney Anderson.
- Rear Admiral Derrick George Kent.
- Rear Admiral Nigel Hugh Malim, MVO.
- Rear Admiral Douglas Granger Parker, DSO, DSC, AFC.

Army

- Major-General Denis Arthur Beckett, DSO, OBE, (113508), late Infantry.
- Major-General John Cain Cowley (141546), Royal Army Pay Corps.
- Brigadier Barbara Masson Gordon, RRC, QHNS, (206176), Queen Alexandra's Royal Army Nursing Corps.
- Major-General Frank Douglas King, MBE, (138204), late Infantry.
- Major-General David Lanyon Lloyd Owen, DSO, OBE, MC, (74596), late Infantry.
- Major-General Alexander Young (174093), late Royal Army Ordnance Corps.

Royal Air Force

- Air Vice-Marshal Neil Cameron, CBE, DSO, DFC.
- Air Vice-Marshal Nigel Martin Maynard, CBE, DFC, AFC.
- Air Vice-Marshal Leslie Howard Moulton, DFC.
- Air Commodore Charles Duncan Alfred Browne, DFC.

Civil Division

- Frederick John Atkinson, Chief Economic Adviser, Department of Trade and Industry.
- Clifford Henry Baylis, Controller, HM Stationery Office.
- Basil Edmund Bellamy, Under-Secretary, Department of Trade and Industry.
- Norman Coles, Deputy Chief Adviser (Research and Studies), Ministry of Defence.
- Peter Richmond Cox, Deputy Government Actuary.
- Herbert Clyde Fitzer, OBE, Director of Engineering (Ships) and Head of the Royal Naval Engineering Service, Ministry of Defence.
- Leonard Ralph Fletcher, Secretary, University Grants Committee.
- Thomas Charles Green, Chief Charity Commissioner.
- Eric William Charles Lewis, Controller of Death Duties, Board of Inland Revenue.
- Jean Josephine Nunn, CBE, lately Deputy Secretary, Cabinet Office.
- John Glendwr Owen, Under-Secretary, HM Treasury.
- Ronald Walter Radford, MBE, Deputy Chairman, Board of Customs and Excise.
- Hume Boggis-Rolfe, CBE, Deputy Clerk of the Crown in Chancery and Deputy Permanent Secretary to the Lord Chancellor.
- Peter Eustace Thornton, Deputy Secretary, Cabinet Office.
- Henry Gabriel Ware, Deputy Treasury Solicitor.
- Henry Yellowlees, MRCP, MRCS, Deputy Chief Medical Officer, Department of Health and Social Security.

=== Order of Saint Michael and Saint George ===
==== Knight Grand Cross of the Order of St Michael and St George (GCMG) ====
- Sir Charles Hepburn Johnston, KCMG, British High Commissioner, Canberra.

==== Knight Commander of the Order of St Michael and St George (KCMG) ====
- Peter Telford Hayman, CMG, CVO, MBE, British High Commissioner, Ottawa.

==== Companion of the Order of St Michael and St George (CMG) ====
- Arthur Hugh Bunting, Professor of Agricultural Botany, University of Reading. For services to developing countries.
- James Richard Cross, lately Senior British Trade Commissioner, Montreal.
- Stanley Mason Davies, Assistant Secretary, Department of Health and Social Security.
- John Ivor McKinnon Rhodes, Minister, United Kingdom Mission to the United Nations.
- Lilian Katherine Somerville, OBE, Director, Fine Arts Department, British Council.

Diplomatic Service and Overseas List

- Gillian Gerda Brown, Counsellor and Head of Chancery, HM Embassy, Berne.
- John Christopher Wyndowe Bushell, Minister and Deputy Commandant, British Military Government, Berlin.
- Ronald Lawrie Huckstep, MD, FRCS, Honorary Surgeon-in-Charge, Round Table Polio Clinic, Kampala.
- Kenneth James Knaggs, OBE, formerly Permanent Secretary, Ministry of Defence, Zambia.
- Daphne Margaret Sybil Desiree Park, HM Consul-General, Hanoi.
- James Grant Purves, HM Consul-General, Hamburg.
- Alastair Todd, Defence Secretary, Hong Kong.
- John Peter Tripp, HM Ambassador, Tripoli.

State of New South Wales

- Charles Aubrey Hardwick, QC. For service to the community.

State of Victoria

- Alan John Moir, of Toorak. For services to horse racing.

State of South Australia

- Colin Sandergrove Ballantyne, of Adelaide. For services to the theatre.

State of Western Australia

- Kenneth Joseph Townsing, ISO, Under-Treasurer for Western Australia. For outstanding public service to the community and to education.

State of Tasmania

- Robert Charles Sharp, Director of Public Works, State of Tasmania.

=== Royal Victorian Order ===
==== Dame Commander of the Royal Victorian Order (DCVO) ====
- Lady Margaret Katherine Hay, CVO.

==== Knight Commander of the Royal Victorian Order (KCVO) ====
- The Very Reverend Robert Wilmer Woods.

==== Commander of the Royal Victorian Order (CVO) ====
- Lady Susan Katharine Hussey.
- Denis Haigh Marrian, PhD.
- George Gaze Pace.
- Paul Edward Paget.
- John Pillar, MVO.

==== Member of the Royal Victorian Order (MVO) ====
At this time the two lowest classes of the Royal Victorian Order were "Member (fourth class)" and "Member (fifth class)", both with post-nominal letters MVO. "Member (fourth class)" was renamed "Lieutenant" (LVO) from the 1985 New Year Honours onwards.

Fourth Class

- Major Ralph Sidney Bromhead.
- Douglas Walter Butt, MVO.
- John Robert Hare.
- Lieutenant-Colonel John Frederick Dame Johnston, MC.
- Captain Norman Henry Morgan, MVO, MM.
- Surgeon Commander John Roger Lawrance-Owen, MBE, Royal Navy.
- Squadron Leader Anthony William Picking, Royal Air Force.
- Squadron Leader Philip George Pinney, Royal Air Force.
- Wing Commander Michael John Rayson, Royal Air Force.
- Brian Barrington Dashwood Stopford.
- Jean Elizabeth Taylor, MVO.
- Derek Roy Waters, MVO.
- Robert William Way.

Fifth Class

- Clarice Winifred Austin.
- John David Gallagher.
- Edith Holmes.
- Harry Docknll Jones.
- Captain Lewis Thomas Lambert, Royal Marines.
- Squadron Leader James Marshall, Royal Air Force.
- Florence Wade.

==== Medal of the Royal Victorian Order (RVM) ====
In Silver

- L0588525 Flight Sergeant Peter James Baughan, Royal Air Force.
- Yeoman Bed Goer John Baxter, Her Majesty's Bodyguard of the Yeomen of the Guard.
- Gladys Bell.
- Albert Victor Charlwood.
- P4185209 Corporal David Arthur Evans, Royal Air Force.
- Chief Petty Officer Roger George Eves, P/JX 660436.
- Lily Foster.
- Robert William Frier.
- Edward Victor Lovegrove.
- Robert Geddes MacDonald.
- Police Constable Ralph Alec Lewis Morten, Metropolitan Police.
- Robertina Nicol.
- Joseph Matthew Pearce.
- Chief Engineering Mechanic David John Rayworth, P/KX 859165.
- Joseph Smith.
- Gwendoline May Suckling.
- John Errick Taylor.
- Walter Vickers.
- Arthur Vincent.
- W4003276 Flight Sergeant Frank Stanhope Williams, BEM, Royal Air Force.

=== Order of the British Empire ===
==== Knight Grand Cross of the Order of the British Empire (GBE) ====
Civil Division

- Sir Henry Alexander Benson, CBE, Senior Partner, Cooper Brothers & Co., Chartered Accountants. For public services.

==== Dame Commander of the Order of the British Empire (DBE) ====
Civil Division

- Adelaide Baillieu Doughty, CBE. For political services in the South East.
- Agatha Mary Clarissa, Lady Mallowan, CBE, (Mrs. Agatha Christie), Author.

==== Knight Commander of the Order of the British Empire (KBE) ====
Military Division

- Major-General John Evelyn Anderson, CBE, (67073), late Royal Corps of Signals, Colonel Commandant Royal Corps of Signals.
- Acting Air Marshal John Hunter Hunter-Tod, CB, OBE, Royal Air Force.

Civil Division

- Sir Herbert Archbold Brechin, CBE, Chairman, Main Organising Committee, 1970 Commonwealth Games.
- Roger Talbot Walters, CBE, Controller General, Department of the Environment.
- Colonel Sir Arthur Edwin Young, CMG, CVO, KPM, lately Chief Constable, Royal Ulster Constabulary.

Diplomatic Service and Overseas List

- The Right Honourable Richard Duke, Baron Coleridge, CBE, lately Executive Secretary to North Atlantic Treaty Organization, Brussels.

==== Commander of the Order of the British Empire (CBE) ====
Military Division

Royal Navy

- Rear Admiral Arthur Francis Caswell.
- Captain Leslie Norman Goddard, BEM.
- Commodore Kenneth Lee-White, MBE.
- Commodore Walter Brown Vickers, RD.

Army

- Brigadier David William Huskisson Birch (105883), late Royal Regiment of Artillery.
- Brigadier Anthony Douglas Brindley, MBE, ADC, (153665), late Royal Corps of Signals.
- Brigadier (acting) Humphrey Gurdon Kemball, OBE, MC, (95490), late Infantry.
- Colonel Gordon McDonald (271060), late Royal Regiment of Artillery.
- Brigadier Leslie Frederick Richards, OBE, (380592), Corps of Royal Military Police.
- Brigadier John Turner Stanyer, OBE, (166001), late Royal Army Ordnance Corps.
- Brigadier William Albert Henry Taylor (236772), Royal Army Pay Corps.
- Brigadier Alexander David Robin Graham Wilson, MBE, (69185), late Infantry, now R.A.R.O.

Royal Air Force

- Air Commodore Douglas Bower, OBE, AFC.
- Air Commodore Eric John Brice, OBE.
- Air Commodore Ernest Waite Wootten, DFC, AFC.
- Group Captain David John Dawson, MRCS, LRCP.
- Group Captain Alan Simpson Pattie.
- Group Captain Denys Herschel Sutton.

Civil Division

- Frank Kendall Abbey, Liaison Officer, in the Yorkshire/Lancashire Region, to the Minister of Agriculture, Fisheries and Food.
- John Harold Alden, Director and Chief Engineer, Vauxhall Motors Ltd. For services to Export.
- Edward Jeffrey Irving Ardizzone, Book Illustrator.
- David Gordon Bannerman, County Architect, Lanarkshire County Council.
- Frank Kenneth Bannister, Professor of Thermodynamics, University of Birmingham.
- John Frederick Bird, MC, TD, Joint Managing Director, Reyrolle Parsons International Ltd. For services to Export.
- Colonel Richard Dawnay Martin-Bird, OBE, TD, DL, Chairman, Territorial Auxiliary and Volunteer Reserve Association, Lancashire, Cheshire and the Isle of Man.
- Roland Ernest Bird, Managing Director, The Economist.
- John Dorman Bolckow. For services to the constructional industry and to Export.
- Catherine Bramwell-Booth. For services with the Salvation Army.
- Eric Stuart Booth, Member for Engineering, Central Electricity Generating Board.
- Arthur Frederick Herman Briscoe, Chairman, National Association of Creamery Proprietors and Wholesale Dairymen.
- William Owen Broughton, Deputy Chief Scientific Officer, Ministry of Aviation Supply.
- William Brown, Managing Director, Scottish Television Ltd.
- John Grahame Douglas Clark, Disney Professor of Archaeology, University of Cambridge.
- William Liggett Clements, General Manager and Secretary, Belfast Harbour Commissioners.
- John Sholto Fitzpatrick Cooke, DL, Clerk of the Parliaments, Northern Ireland.
- George Ivor Crawford, lately Assistant Secretary, Department of Education and Science.
- Matthew Anthony Leonard Cripps, DSO, TD, QC. For political and public services.
- Mary Bronwen Gummow Smedley-Crooke, OBE. For services to the British Legion Women's Section.
- John Fothergill Crosfield, Founder and Managing Director, Crosfield Electronics Ltd. For services to Export.
- Arthur Ivan Darling, FDSRCS, FCPath, Professor of Dental Medicine, University of Bristol.
- Stanley Gwynne Deavin, OBE, Chairman, North Eastern Gas Board.
- Osian Gwynn Ellis, Harpist.
- Alderman Laura Irene Fitzpatrick, Chairman, Yorkshire West Riding County Council Education Committee.
- Charles Wesley Gair, Divisional Road Engineer (Northern), Department of the Environment.
- Professor James Learmonth Gowans, MB, BS. For services to Medical Science.
- Victor Harry Thomas Grout, Senior Principal Inspector of Taxes, Board of Inland Revenue.
- Oscar Rudolf Eric Max Hahn, Chairman, West Midlands Conciliation Committee, Race Relations Board.
- John Menzies Halliday, Professor of Conveyancing, University of Glasgow.
- Robert Abraham Hamilton, Deputy Chairman, Agricultural Division, Imperial Chemical Industries Ltd. For services to Export.
- Francis John Hart, lately Assistant Director, The Royal Ballet.
- Peter Heatly, Chairman, Commonwealth Games Council for Scotland and Vice-Chairman, Main Organising Committee, 1970 Games.
- Arthur Carleton Hetherington, MBE, Secretary, County Councils Association of England and Wales.
- Professor Humphrey Robert Hewer, OBE, Chairman, Farm Animal Welfare Advisory Committee.
- Derek Isaac Heys, TD, Senior Partner, Heys Wall & Co., Liverpool. For services to Export.
- Kenneth Stephenson Himsworth, Clerk to the Westmorland County Council.
- William Hill Hunter. For political services in Scotland.
- James Holmes Hutchison, OBE, MD, FRCP, Samson Gemmell Professor of Child Health, University of Glasgow.
- Lancelot William Cripps Ibbotson, MBE, General Manager, Southern Region of British Railways.
- Henry Norman Jenner, MBE, County Surveyor, Hampshire County Council.
- Christopher Jolliffe, Director, Science Division, Science Research Council.
- Grace Mary Jones, Assistant Secretary, Department of Health and Social Security.
- Kenneth David Jones, OBE, Regional Controller, Department of Employment.
- Michael Joughin. For services to Scottish agriculture.
- Gerald Hocken Knight. For services to Church Music.
- Norman Cecil Lake, Deputy Managing Director, Head Wrightson & Co. Ltd. For services to Export.
- Frederick John Murray Laver, Board Member, Data Processing Service, Post Office.
- Ian William Murray Leslie, OBE, lately Editor, Building.
- John Cornelius McGrath, Board Member and Financial Controller, British Airports Authority.
- George Yull Mackie, DSO, DFC. For political services in Scotland.
- Alexander MacLennan, Director, Huddersfield College of Education (Technical).
- Samuel James McMahon, Chairman, Craigavon Development Commission.
- William Marsh, Director and Chief Engineer, Rolls-Royce and Associates Ltd., Derby.
- Henry Roderick Moore, MBE, Chairman, Board of Governors, The London Hospital.
- Leonard Francis Neal. For services to industrial relations.
- John Finlay Niven, Convener, Wigtown County Council.
- James Ross Parratt, Chairman, Birds Eye Foods Ltd.
- Ian Macnaghten Parsons, OBE, Chairman, Chatto & Windus Ltd.
- Ronald Peddie, Managing Director, Administration, British Steel Corporation.
- John Hereward Pitchford, Chairman, Ricardo & Company Engineers (1927) Ltd. For services to Export.
- John Melville Price, Assistant Managing Director, GEC-AEI Telecommunications Ltd. For services to Export.
- Cyril Percy Rawlings, Assistant Secretary, Department of Trade and Industry.
- George Reith, Director of Education, Edinburgh.
- Henry Willasey Brookes Richards, OBE, Chairman, Trustee Savings Banks Employers' Council.
- William James Richards, QPM, Chief Constable, Manchester and Salford Police.
- Vivian Hughes Ridler, Printer to the University of Oxford.
- Alderman Robert Carr Rodgers, MBE. For political and public services in Manchester.
- Eugene Rosenberg, Senior Partner, Yorke, Rosenberg & Mardall.
- Captain Stephen Wentworth Roskill, DSC, Naval Historian.
- Clarence Milton Edwards Seaman, lately Headmaster, Christ's Hospital, Horsham.
- Otto Secher, Chairman and Managing Director, Marchon Division, Albright and Wilson Ltd. For services to Export.
- James Shanks, HM Chief Inspector of Schools, Scottish Education Department.
- Lillian Nell, Lady Silverstone. For political services in the South East.
- Ida Phyllis Barclay-Smith, MBE. For services to preservation and conservation.
- Richard Smith, Artist.
- Ernest William Still, Consultant, Normalair-Garrett Ltd. For services to Export.
- Thomas Alan Swinden, lately Director, Engineering Industry Training Board.
- Arnold Joseph Taylor, Chief Inspector of Ancient Monuments and Historic Buildings, Department of the Environment.
- William Tweddle, OBE, TD, Chairman, Leeds (St. James's) University Hospital Management Committee.
- George Mesban Vine, Chief Commoner, City of London.
- James Walker, FRCP, FRCOG, Professor of Obstetrics and Gynaecology, University of Dundee.
- Spencer Reuben Walker, lately Deputy Receiver and Director of Administration, Metropolitan Police.
- Ian James Wallace, OBE. For political and public services in the West Midlands.
- Captain William Eldon Warwick, Commodore Master, SS Queen Elizabeth 2, The Cunard Steamship Company Ltd.
- Donald John Watson, Deputy Director and Head of Botany Department, Rothamsted Experimental Station, Harpenden.
- Andrew Wilson, FRCP, FPS, Professor of Pharmacology and General Therapeutics, University of Liverpool.
- Alfred Lemuel Peter Wood, Chairman, Peter Wood & Co. Ltd.
- Professor John Crossley Wood. For services to industrial relations.

Diplomatic Service and Overseas List

- John Philip Aserappa, Commissioner for Resettlement, Hong Kong.
- Hugh Ronald Barton, MBE, lately President of the British Chamber of Commerce, Bordeaux.
- Donald Alfred Berriff, Director, South Africa Britain Trade Association, Johannesburg.
- William Roy Billington, OBE, MD, BChir, lately Medical Superintendent, Mengo Hospital, Kampala.
- Robert Nathaniel Boyd, lately Auditor-General, Zambia.
- Henry James Corley Dryden, OBE, British Liaison Officer, Australian Department of Defence, Melbourne.
- Robin Anthony Hare Duke, OBE, British Council Representative, Japan.
- Neville Lewis Fakes. For services to British interests in Japan.
- Magnus Halcrow, OBE, General Manager, Reconstruction and Development Corporation, British Honduras.
- The Right Reverend John Farmer Healy, Roman Catholic Bishop of Gibraltar.
- Hugh Maxwell Mill, For services to British commercial interests in Brazil.
- Christian Arthur Edgar O'Brien. For services to British interests in Iran.
- David Francis Pawson, OBE. For services to British interests in Greece.
- Horace Emmanuele Luigi Plant. For services to British interests in the Argentine.
- Alan Charles Riddle, Deputy General Manager, Uganda Cement Industry.
- Thomas Michael Budworth Sharp, OBE, lately Secretary, Interim Common Services Agency, Nigeria.
- Frederick Henry Sims, MBE, lately Auditor-General, East African Community.
- Charles Derek Wootten-Woolley. For services to the community in Nigeria.

State of New South Wales

- Guy Edward Warre Harriott. For services to journalism.
- Newman Eugene Manion. For services to horse-racing.

State of Victoria

- Bernard James Callinan, DSO, MC, of Kew. For services to civil engineering.
- The Very Reverend Dean Tom William Thomas, of Melbourne. For services to the community.

State of Queensland

- William Hamilton Hart, of Brisbane. For outstanding services to the legal profession.

State of South Australia

- Thomas Alfred Barnes, of Myrtle Bank, lately Director of Mines, State of South Australia.
- Kenneth Lance Milne, Agent-General for South Australia in London.

State of Western Australia

- Emeritus Professor Colsell Smurthwaite Sanders. For services to education.

==== Officer of the Order of the British Empire (OBE) ====
Military Division

Royal Navy

- Surgeon Commander (D) Philip Reginald John Duly, LDS.
- Commander Christopher William Eason.
- Commander Harold Beaton Grant, (Retd.)
- Lieutenant Colonel (Local Colonel) Alan Godfrey Herbert Jukes, Royal Marines.
- Commander Robert MacRae Kelso, RD, Royal Naval Reserve.
- The Reverend George Knight, Chaplain.
- Commander James Eric Grant McKee.
- Commander John Robert Wadman.
- Commander John Francis Howard Wheeler.
- Commander Peter John Williams.
- Commander John Leonard Wood.

Army

- Lieutenant-Colonel (Quartermaster) Winifred Doreen Andrews (441495), Women's Royal Army Corps.
- Lieutenant-Colonel Archibald Cull Birtwistle (406347), Royal Corps of Signals.
- Lieutenant-Colonel David Ernest Blum (302340), The Queen's Regiment.
- Lieutenant-Colonel (Quartermaster) George Clapham (160228), Royal Corps of Transport.
- Lieutenant-Colonel Edward Hudson Farrally (194351), Royal Army Ordnance Corps.
- Lieutenant-Colonel (Staff Quartermaster) Arthur Reginald Gardiner (207446), Royal Corps of Transport.
- Lieutenant-Colonel (Quartermaster) James Gillett, (356651), Royal Regiment of Artillery, now retired.
- Lieutenant-Colonel Gerald Frederick Grace (207848), Royal Regiment of Artillery.
- Lieutenant-Colonel Michael Stuart Gray (424340), The Parachute Regiment.
- Lieutenant-Colonel Barry Anthony Travers Hammond (212826), Royal Regiment of Artillery.
- Lieutenant-Colonel Maurice Robert Johnston (403506), 1st The Queen's Dragoon Guards.
- Lieutenant-Colonel Norman George Kirby (413375), Royal Army Medical Corps.
- Lieutenant-Colonel Thomas Bertie Vawdrey Marsh (273457), Corps of Royal Engineers.
- Lieutenant-Colonel Hector John Arnold Moore (370286), The Queen's Regiment.
- Lieutenant-Colonel David Richard Morgan, TD, (323573), Lancastrian Volunteers Territorial and Army Volunteer Reserve.
- Lieutenant-Colonel Robert Francis Richardson, MBE, (408020), The Royal Scots (The Royal Regiment).
- Lieutenant-Colonel George Reginald Riddick, MC, (68915), Corps of Royal Electrical and Mechanical Engineers.
- Lieutenant-Colonel (Acting) Michael Hugh Alban Scott, TD, (121682), Combined Cadet Force.
- Lieutenant-Colonel John Michael Chetwynd Thornton, MC, (376147), 7th Duke of Edinburgh's Own Gurkha Rifles.
- Lieutenant-Colonel John Joseph Wilson (408082), Royal Regiment of Artillery.

Royal Air Force

- Wing Commander Anthony William Wheldon Atkinson, AFC, (193431).
- Wing Commander George Francis Banyard (157933).
- Wing Commander Alan French (4048589).
- Wing Commander James Johnston (58076).
- Wing Commander Edward George King (49493).
- Wing Commander Keith Martin (1584792).
- Wing Commander George Keith Mossman (607021).
- Wing Commander Frank Reginald Pusey, MBE, (55599).
- Wing Commander Leslie Francis Ralls (48666).
- Wing Commander Michael Oliver Rayner (57944).
- Wing Commander Charles James Samouelle, DFC, (113341).
- Wing Commander Jack Trotman (31407).
- Wing Commander Roy Turner (106114).

Civil Division

- Cuthbert Henry Dyke Acland, North-Western Area Agent, The National Trust.
- Raymond John Adie, Senior Principal Scientific Officer, British Antarctic Survey.
- John Alexander, Senior Mooring Salvage and Booms Officer, Ministry of Defence.
- Sydney George Allchin, Higher Collector, Board of Customs and Excise.
- Muriel Louise Anthony, Director, The Kent Music School.
- Philip Gordon Armitage, Chairman, Manchester and Salford Trustee Savings Bank.
- Kate Mary Austen, Headmistress, Kingsgate Infant School, Kilburn, London.
- James Orr Bailie (Jim Bailie) For political services in Northern Ireland.
- Alan Douglas Cresswell Leggatt Bain, Senior Inspector of Taxes, Board of Inland Revenue.
- Paul Louis Jean Bareau. For services to financial and economic journalism.
- John Wykeham Barnes. For services in connection with the training of geologists in under-developed countries.
- Frederick Bell, Director of Engineering, West Midlands Gas Board.
- Mary Blakeley, President, Royal College of Nursing.
- Walter Blott, Air Traffic Control Officer Grade 1, Department of Trade and Industry.
- James Bolton, Director, Textile Council Productivity Centre, Manchester.
- Michael Francis Bonallack. For services to Golf.
- Walter Edward Bowden, lately Head of Dairy By-Products, Milk Marketing Board for England and Wales.
- The Reverend Euros Bowen. For services to Welsh Literature.
- Gordon Arthur Bowyer, Display Designer. For services in connection with the British Pavilion at Expo' 70.
- Margaret Boyd. For services to Women's Lacrosse.
- William Boyd, MB, ChB, Consultant Psychiatrist, Scottish Home and Health Department.
- Vincent Bradley, Headmaster, Hucklow Middle School, Sheffield.
- Francis Leslie Broughton, TD, lately County Surveyor, Cumberland County Council.
- Henry Oliver Bryant, Principal Information Officer, Central Office of Information.
- Anne Mary Buck, Keeper, Gallery of English Costume, Manchester.
- Henry Montague Bullard, Head of Overseas Department, The London Chamber of Commerce. For services to Export.
- Douglas Gordon Burton, Chief Diesel Engineer, C.A.V. Ltd. For services to Export.
- Angus Campbell, Secretary, David MacBrayne Ltd., Glasgow.
- William Joseph Campbell, Assistant General Manager and Chief Accountant, Navy, Army and Air Force Institutes.
- Alfred Henry Cantrell, ERD, Consultant to Kennedy and Donkin, and to the Construction Industry Training Board.
- William Carmichael, Director of Organisation, 1970 Commonwealth Games.
- Eva Renee Cathcart, County Secretary and County Treasurer, Yorkshire North Riding Soldiers', Sailors' and Airmen's Families Association.
- Elizabeth Dampier-Child, lately Headmistress, Avebury Primary School, Wiltshire.
- Thomas William Redvers Christophers. For services to the community in Cornwall.
- Tadeusz Leopold Joseph Ciastula, Chief Engineer and Special Director, Westland Helicopters Ltd., Yeovil. For services to Export.
- Raymond Thurston Clarke, Formerly Chairman, Working Group on Advisory Services for Immigrants.
- John Cecil Clavering, Superintending Architect, Department of the Environment.
- Colonel Ewart Waide Clay, MBE, lately Editor, Yorkshire Evening Post.
- Brian Morton Cobbe, Superintending Engineer (Electrical), Department of the Environment.
- David Collins. For services to the Magistracy in the West Midlands.
- Mungo Conacher, North Western Regional Member, National Savings Committee.
- Alderman Harold Douglas Cowan, Chairman, Redbridge Borough Savings Committee.
- James Henry Cox, Senior Ship Surveyor, Department of Trade and Industry.
- John Cormack Craig, Chairman, Aberdeen Fishing Industry Joint Committee.
- Harold Edgar Crossley. For services to fuel technology.
- Geoffrey Beves Crow, Chairman, Beves & Co., Shoreham.
- Eirlys Rhiwen Cadwaladr Cullen (Miss Eirlys Roberts), Head of Research and Editorial Division, Consumers' Association.
- Christopher Thomas Dabell, Chairman and Managing Director, South Notts Bus Company Ltd.
- Gwyn Tudwal Davies, Chairman, Caernarvonshire Agricultural Executive Committee.
- Kenneth Bertram Day, Director, Ernest Benn Ltd.
- Fanny de Keyser (Miss Fanny Waterman), Joint Chairman, Leeds International Pianoforte Competition.
- Bernard Dobson, Assistant Accountant General, Department of the Environment.
- Bertram John Frederick Dorrington, Regional Chairman, London and South East Region, Air Training Corps.
- John Douglas, Town Clerk, Dunfermline.
- Claude Sibthorpe Eales, Chief Engineer, Production Group, United Kingdom Atomic Energy Authority.
- Samuel James Havard-Evans, Chairman, Agricultural Land Tribunal for Wales.
- Harry Hornby Fairclough. For political and public services in Lancashire.
- Harold Fletcher, Senior Inspector of Mathematics, Staffordshire County Council.
- Alderman William Roderick Foulkes. For public and local government services in Cheshiie.
- Eric Knight Freebrey, lately Principal Land Surveyor, Valuation Department, Greater London Council.
- John Garrett, Headmaster, Ysgol Erw'r Delyn Residential School for Physically Handicapped Children, Penarth, Glamorgan.
- Leonard George Gooch, Manufacturing Director, Roneo-Vickers, Dartford.
- Leslie Gooday, Architect and Industrial Designer. For services in connection with the British Government Pavilion at Expo' 70.
- Cyril Charles Goodhind, MBE, Secretary, The Scout Association.
- Alexander Henry Goodman, Chairman, Accountancy Committee, Building Societies Association.
- Kenneth Graham, Head of Organisation Department, Trades Union Congress.
- William Vinter Gurteen, TD, Chairman, D. Gurteen & Sons Ltd. For services to Export.
- Reginald Edward Hawke Hadingham, MC, TD, Marketing Director, Slazengers Ltd., Croydon. For services to Export.
- Frederick Charles Haliburton, lately Telephone Controller, Post Office, Northern Ireland.
- Arthur Hambleton, MC, QPM, Chief Constable, Dorset and Bournemouth Constabulary.
- Patrick Joseph Hammond, Chief Personnel Manager, High Duty Alloys, Slough.
- Cyril George Hancock, Head of Department, The Electricity Council.
- The Honourable Beryl Gladys Cozens-Hardy. For services to the Girl Guides.
- Jeffery Graham Harrison, MRCS, LRCP, Honorary Scientific Adviser, The Wildfowlers' Association.
- Maud Alice Harrison, MBE, lately County Superintendent (Nursing), St. John Ambulance Brigade.
- Dora Elizabeth Harvie, Children's Officer, Kent County Council.
- Walter Thomas Frederick Hassan, Director and Group Chief Engineer, Power Units, Jaguar Cars Ltd. For services to Export.
- Ernest Joseph Weaver Hawkins. For services to the restoration of ancient mosaics.
- Harold Osborn Hawkins, Clerk of Chesterfield Rural District Council.
- Dorothy Jean Heap. For services to youth in the North-West.
- Thomas Heseltine. For political and public services in Yorkshire.
- William Lewis Hicks, lately Chairman, Isles of Scilly Agricultural Executive Committee.
- Frank Edward Hicham, Director General, The Motor Agents' Association Ltd.
- John Sydney Hodges, Vice-Chairman, Walsall Trustee Savings Bank.
- Sydney Whittaker Holmes, Assistant General Manager, Ferranti Ltd., Edinburgh.
- John Plaistowe Horder, MRCP, MRCGP, General Practitioner, London N.W.1.
- John Norwood Horsfall, Alderman, Bradford City Council.
- Edward Ronald Horsman, Clerk to the Justices, Eastleigh, Romsey, Totton and New Forest Divisions of Hampshire.
- Arthur James Hunt, Principal Planning Inspector, Department of the Environment.
- Henry James Ellis Hunt, Deputy Assistant Commissioner, Metropolitan Police.
- George Smith Innes, Consultant in Medical Engineering, St. Bartholomew's Hospital, London.
- Christopher Ironside, Coin Designer and Sculptor.
- Kenneth Neville Irvine, DM, General Practitioner, Henley-on-Thames.
- Irene Mary James, Principal Officer, National Nursing Staff Committee.
- James Kelly Johnston, Secretary, Eastern Regional Hospital Board, Scotland.
- Emyr Wyn Jones, MD, FRCP. For public and medical services in Wales.
- Hugh Ferguson Jones. For political and public services in Wales.
- Iris Marjorie Jones. For services to the community in Bath.
- Karel John Kucek, Group Managing Director, Lotus Shoes Ltd., Banbridge, County Down, Northern Ireland. For services to Export.
- John Lait, Principal Lecturer, Electronics Branch, Royal Military College of Science, Shrivenham, Wiltshire.
- Charles Edward Lambert, lately Director, P. & O. Lines Ltd.
- Arthur Lovelace Langabeer, Chief Executive Officer, Department of Trade and Industry.
- John Alldis Large, Managing Director, West's Piling & Construction Co. Ltd., Coinbrook, Slough.
- George William Lee, Secretary General, National Society for Mentally Handicapped Children.
- Leslie Leiner, Chairman, P. Leiner & Sons Ltd., Treforest, Glamorgan. For services to Export.
- Colonel Reginald Nathaniel Levitt, MBE, TD. For services to the British Legion in Scotland.
- Alderman John Lisle, Chairman, St. George's Hospital Management Committee and Member, Newcastle upon Tyne Regional Hospital Board.
- James Richard Lister, lately Secretary, Carlisle Diocesan Board of Finance.
- Edric Ivor Lloyd, Principal Scientific Officer, Ministry of Aviation Supply.
- John Francis Lowe, MRCS, LRCP, General Practitioner, Liverpool.
- John Roddick Russell MacGregor. For political services.
- Albert William McIntosh, Independent Member, Post Office Economic Development Council.
- John Alexander Rose Macphail, Managing Director, Robertson and Baxter Ltd. For services to Export.
- Herbert Stanley McReynolds, Principal, Ministry of Health and Social Services for Northern Ireland.
- Henry Richard Mainwood, Principal Organiser of Library Services, Inner London Education Authority.
- Edward Alexander Mair, Director of Marketing, British Egg Marketing Board.
- Henry Alastair Maxwell, lately Conservator, North Scotland, Forestry Commission.
- Constance Bertha Mitchell (Miss Constance Shacklock), Singer.
- David Dalrymple Mitchell, Director, British Furniture Manufacturers' Federated Associations. For services to Export.
- Kenneth Valentine Freeland Morton, CIE, Secretary, East Anglian Regional Hospital Board.
- Pamela Margaret Mount, lately Chairman, Council of the Association of WRNS.
- Thomas Benjamin Mullender, Fish Merchant, Fleetwood.
- Edward Lindsay Carson Mullins, Secretary, Editorial Board, History of Parliament Trust.
- Henry Forbes Murphy. For services to legal aid and education in Scotland.
- Stanley Oscar Myers, Principal, Condover Hall School for blind children.
- Thomas David Nudds. For political services.
- Sidney Arthur James Oldham, Director of Parks, Glasgow Corporation.
- John Alfred Andrew O'Shea, Sales Manager, Australasia and Far East, British European Airways.
- Alan Clive Packham, Governor, HM Prison Birmingham.
- Laurence Gunion Parker, TD, Secretary, Independent Television Companies Association Ltd.
- Michael Tennyson Deighton Patmore. For services to the National Association of Boys' Clubs.
- Llewellyn Colin Mackay Paxton, MBE, Chairman, Portsmouth and District War Pensions Committee.
- Thomas James Perrett Pearce, lately Manager, Projects and Engineering Department, Agricultural Division, Imperial Chemical Industries Ltd.
- Jonathan Penrose. For services to Chess.
- Rosemary Chesters Perkes, Matron, Royal Maternity Hospital, Belfast.
- Charles London Pickering, HM Inspector, Department of Education and Science.
- John Worthington Polito, Director, G. Stibbe & Co. Ltd., Leicester. For services to Export.
- Alderman John Poole, Chairman, Northampton and District Local Savings Committee.
- Sydney White Potter, Assistant Director, Royal Aircraft Establishment, Farnborough.
- Harold Hugh Prescott, Assistant Chief Constable, Lancashire Constabulary.
- Mima May Puddicombe, lately Matron, Addenbrooke's Hospital, Cambridge.
- John Joseph Raftery, Senior Chief Executive Officer, Ministry of Aviation Supply.
- Richard Alan Rainford, Bursar, University of Manchester.
- Nancie Hughes-Reckitt. For political and public services in East Anglia.
- Geoffrey Redmayne. For services to the National Council of Social Service.
- Arthur Loten Roberts, Livesey Professor of Coal Gas and Fuel Industries, University of Leeds.
- Ernest Robertson, Provost of Dumfries.
- James Sloan Mutrie Robertson, MB, FRCS, lately Consultant Neurosurgeon, Western Regional Hospital Board (Scotland).
- Stephen Joseph Robinson, Scientific Adviser, Mullard Research Laboratories, Redhill, Surrey.
- Alan Frederick Royle, Chief Executive Officer, Board of Inland Revenue.
- Frederick Bryan Lys Sall, MBE, Foreign and Commonwealth Office.
- Bernard Ford Sander, Higher Collector, Board of Customs and Excise.
- Anthony Patrick Hodgms Saul, Director, British Institute of Recorded Sound.
- John Saville, Chairman, York Executive Council.
- James Knox Scobbie, Rector, Dalziel High School, Motherwell.
- Harold Kyle Scott, MBE, County Surveyor, Londonderry.
- John Newton Scott, TD, Clerk to the New Forest Verderers.
- Professor Geoffrey Donald Sims, Head of the Department of Electronics, University of Southampton.
- Herbert Edward Smith, Flight Services Manager, British Overseas Airways Corporation.
- David Walter Taylor Smithies, Foreign and Commonwealth Office.
- Oliver William Standingford, Member, Commercial and Clerical Training Committee, Central Training Council.
- Norman Stewart. For public and local government services in North Wales.
- John Bolam Storey, Engineer and Surveyor, Ipswich County Borough.
- Frederick Robert Storrie. For services to youth and museums in Scotland.
- John Hunter Strathie, lately President, Scottish Association of National Health Service Executive Councils.
- Thomas Hawksley Summerson, DL, Chairman, Darlington and North Yorkshire Local Employment Committee.
- Ivor Ronald Swain. For political and public services in London.
- George Tarjan, Head of Central European Service, British Broadcasting Corporation.
- Cyril Frederick Taylor, DL. For public and charitable services in Berkshire.
- Joyce May Taylor, Chief Executive Officer, Department of Health and Social Security.
- William Thompson. For charitable services in Lancashire.
- Ethel May Tipple, Alderman, Norfolk County Council.
- Hugh Henry Walker, lately Secretary and Acting Director-General, United Nations Association.
- Hazel Vincent Wallace, Managing Director, Thorndike Theatre, Leatherhead.
- Wilfred Mark Ward, Chief Officer, Buckinghamshire Fire Brigade.
- William Ward, Electrical Engineer (Generation), London Transport Executive.
- George Ralph Wardle, Alderman, Northumberland County Council.
- Sylvester Neville Watson, Chief Engineer, Television, British Broadcasting Corporation.
- James Leslie Webb, Chief Engineer, The Royal Automobile Club.
- George William Welland, General Secretary, Cambridge House, London.
- Christopher John Wells, MBE, TD, MB, ChB, General Practitioner, Sheffield.
- Frederick Wickstead, Chairman, Forest of Dean (Cinderford) and District Local Employment Committee.
- Donald Hector Williams, Controller, Personnel and Finance, North Eastern Postal Region.
- Peter Lancelot Williams, Editor, Dance and Dancers.
- Arthur Edward Wilson, MBE, Grade 2 Officer, Department of Employment.
- Arthur Agnew Worthington, Senior Principal Scientific Officer, Ministry of Defence.
- Alfred Worthy, Principal Probation Officer, City of Birmingham Probation and After-Care Service.

Diplomatic Service and Overseas List

- Ian Banwell Aers, Speaker, House of Assembly, Swaziland.
- Clement Arthur George Aldcroft, DSC. For services to banking and to the British community in Sudan.
- Geoffrey St. George Turner Allen, MC. For services to the British community in India.
- Alexander Scott Anderson, MBE. For services to British interests in Yugoslavia.
- Lieutenant-Colonel Sydney Aloysius Anderson, MVO, MBE, QPM, Commissioner, Royal Saint Vincent Police Force.
- George William Baker, VRD, Head of Chancery, HM Embassy, Kinshasa.
- Arthur David Bolland, MBE. For services to British interests in Cochin, India.
- Hugh Catchpole. For services to education in Pakistan.
- Major Hugh Abdy Collins, Chief Executive Officer, Agricultural Society of Kenya.
- Captain John Stuart Crawford, DSO, Royal Navy (Retired), lately HM Consul, Tromso.
- Charles St. Clair Dacon. For public services in Saint Vincent.
- Dermot Renn Davis, Attorney-General, British Solomon Islands Protectorate.
- Donald Martin Diment, lately Information and Broadcasting Adviser, The Gambia.
- Hugh Pochin Dinwiddy, lately Dean of Makerere University College, Uganda.
- George Albert Dolman, lately Principal, Karachi Grammar School, Pakistan.
- John Evans, Deputy Permanent Secretary, Ministry of Agriculture and Natural Resources, Malawi.
- Elizabeth Joan Ferguson, Senior Commercial Officer, British High Commission, Canberra.
- Michael Allan Rawson Gardiner. For services to British interests in Iraq.
- Stanley Gascoigne, Permanent Secretary, Education and Libraries, Bermuda.
- Lieutenant-Colonel Louis Henry Goodhew, Chairman of the British Legion, Marseilles.
- Cecil Ernest Greatorex, MBE, lately First Secretary (Information), British High Commission, Port of Spain.
- Edwin Scott Haydon, Registrar, Supreme Court, Hong Kong.
- Arthur Norman Higgitt. For services to British commercial interests in Algeria.
- Francis David Hughes, lately Cultural Attaché, HM Embassy, Prague.
- Donald Raymond Hunter, lately Director of Geological Survey and Mines, Swaziland.
- John Hussey. For services to British interests in Burundi.
- Alan Edward King. For services to British interests in Ethiopia.
- Creswick Winville King, MBE, Secretary to the Cabinet, Saint Lucia.
- Roger John King, Director of Buildings, Malawi.
- John Black Kite. For services to commerce in Hong Kong.
- Jacobus Marthinus Lourens Klopper, MB, BCh, Director of Medical Services, Swaziland.
- Ferdinand Geoffrey Larminie. For services to British interests in Alaska.
- Anthony Harry Leigh-Morgan. For services to British interests in Kuwait.
- John Newman Lewis. For services to British interests in Yugoslavia.
- George Lillywhite. For services to British interests in Israel.
- Walter Thomas Kidd Loney, Honorary British Trade Correspondent, Hobart, Tasmania.
- James Duncan Macgregor, MD, Director of Medical Services, British Solomon Islands Protectorate.
- Colin Thomas McGurk, MBE, First Secretary (Commercial), HM Embassy, Kuwait.
- Dennis Frederick Martin, United Kingdom Technical Assistance Officer, El Salvador.
- Kenneth Milburn, Director of Marine, Hong Kong.
- Lieutenant-Commander George Myles Thomas Osborn, DSO, DSC, Royal Navy (Retired), lately British Colombo Plan Technical Co-operation Officer, Laos.
- Guy Joseph Overbeke, lately Acting Senior Deputy Registrar, West African Examinations Council, Nigeria.
- Horace Godber Owen. For services to British interests in Malaysia.
- The Reverend William Owen, lately Headmaster, Njiri School, Kenya.
- The Reverend William Popham Hosford, MBE. For services to the British community in Rotterdam.
- Arnold Wright Rhodes, lately Assistant Commissioner, Zambia Police Force.
- Captain Reginald Lawrence Rickard, Captain of the Port, Gibraltar.
- David Rubin, Consul, HM Consulate-General, Düsseldorf.
- Hugh Wilfred Sansom, lately Deputy Director, East African Meteorological Department.
- Geoffrey Layton Scullard, lately HM Consul (Commercial), Los Angeles.
- Evelyn Constance Louvain Seguin, lately member of United Nations Educational, Scientific and Cultural Organization, Paris.
- John Evelyn Smallwood, Deputy British High Commissioner, Ibadan.
- William Allan Southorn, Head of Chemistry Division, Rubber Research Institute, Malaysia.
- John Alan Speares, First Secretary, HM Embassy, Amman.
- Alexander William Bruce Strachan, First Secretary (Development), HM Embassy, Amman.
- John Otto Taleen. For services to the Paris Branch of the British Legion.
- Maxwell James Thompson, Registrar, Supreme Court, Bahama Islands.
- Donald Harold Upton, Postal Adviser to the Liberian Government.
- Eric Victor Vines, First Secretary (Information), HM Embassy, Mexico.
- Wilson Tze-sam Wang. For public services in Hong Kong.
- John Wilson, MBE. For services to British interests in Belgium.
- Lauriston Francis Wilson, Permanent Secretary (Finance), Grenada.
- Kenneth John Windsor, First Secretary (Aid), British High Commission, Zomba.

State of New South Wales

- Una Parry Boyce. For services to war widows.
- Frederick Stanley Buckley. For services to industry.
- Joseph Calcraft. For services to the dairy industry.
- Francis Xavier Gaffney (The Reverend Brother Henry). For services to education and sport.
- Emile Joseph McMahon. For services to the building industry.
- Alderman Nicholas Michael Shehadie. For services to local government and sport.
- Frederick Walter Sutton. For philanthropic activities.

State of Victoria

- Councillor Leslie William Allen, of Mulgrave. For services to local government and to the community.
- Leslie James Cochrane, of Kooweerup. For services to the community.
- Councillor James Henderson, of Portarlington. For services to the community.
- Frederick Godfrey James. For services to industry in Shepparton.
- Joyce Olive Macartney, of Brighton. For services to the community.
- Councillor Alan Crocker Pittard. For services to the community in Ballarat.

State of Queensland

- Cecil Phillip Abotomey, of Brisbane. For services to the community and to charity.
- Florence Edna Carvosso, of Gympie. For services to the community, particularly the Red Cross Society.
- Henry Macedon Clarke, of Mingela. For services to local government.
- Leslie Halberstater, MB, ChM, of Townsville. For services to medicine, to community organisation and to sport.
- Neville Gordon Hatton, MC, MM, VD, of Brisbane. For long and distinguished community service.

State of South Australia

- Lloyd Evan Davies, of South Brighton. For services to music.
- Mary Horton Evins, of Springfield. For services to the community.
- Johannes Arthur Reusch, of Nuriootpa. For services to the community.

State of Western Australia

- Phyllis Frances Lee. For services to nursing.
- Robert Bruce Lefroy. For services to the agricultural community in Western Australia.
- John Pethybridge. For services to local government.
- Alfred Spencer, of Perth. For long and meritorious service to local government.

State of Tasmania

- The Honourable Lloyd Horton Carins. For services to local government and to the community.
- William Nicolle Oats. For services to education.

==== Member of the Order of the British Empire (MBE) ====
Military Division

Royal Navy

- Lieutenant (CS) James Hogg, Royal Marines.
- Supply Lieutenant (W) Michael James Jenkins.
- Lieutenant Commander Charles Benjamin Kennedy.
- Lieutenant Alistair Laurie Lang, (formerly on loan to the Royal Malaysian Navy).
- Lieutenant Commander (SD) (tas) Ronald Stephen Colin Robinson.
- Instructor Lieutenant Commander James Lomax Smith, (Retd.)
- Engineer Lieutenant Commander (ME) Alexander John Todd.
- Lieutenant Commander Matthew Robert Todd.
- Engineer Lieutenant (ME) Dennis Turner.
- Engineer Lieutenant Commander (AE) Ronald Stephen Jesse Wightman.

Army

- Major Caledon Alexander (349440), Royal Yeomanry Regiment (Volunteers) Territorial and Army Volunteer Reserve, now R.A.R.O.
- 22559472 Warrant Officer Class II William Drennan Allan, Royal Army Ordnance Corps.
- Major Patrick Read Ashley (445781), Royal Regiment of Artillery.
- Major Richard Christopher Ashman (451182), 7th Duke of Edinburgh's Own Gurkha Rifles, now retired.
- 23233878 Warrant Officer Class II George Bartle, Royal Army Ordnance Corps.
- Major Geoffrey Howard Barton (407747), Corps of Royal Engineers.
- Major Robin Howard Gillbe Barton (411883), Royal Corps of Transport.
- Major John Cecil Vaughan Biles (445793), Royal Regiment of Artillery.
- 22308939 Warrant Officer Class I George Henry Brown, The Queen's Regiment.
- Captain (Quartermaster) Alfred Buckley (475791), The Light Infantry.
- Major Michael Ian Burkham (430250), The Royal Welch Fusiliers.
- Major Alfred Charlton (194296), Royal Corps of Transport.
- The Reverend Robert Cheadle, Chaplain to the Forces Third Class (330349), Royal Army Chaplains' Department, Territorial and Army Volunteer Reserve, now R.A.R.O.
- Major Charles Dalzell Craigie Halkett (418234), The Royal Highland Fusiliers (Princess Margaret's Own Glasgow and Ayrshire Regiment).
- Major Peter Lawson Dell (439986), Corps of Royal Engineers.
- Major (Quartermaster) Patrick Donovan (452702), The Queen's Regiment.
- Captain Roy Reginald Emerson, BEM, (482367), Royal Tank Regiment.
- 22559467 Warrant Officer Class II William Francis Graham, Royal Corps of Signals.
- Major (Acting) William Guest, TD, (135720) Army Cadet Force.
- 22242470 Warrant Officer Class II Desmond John Hall, Royal Corps of Signals, Territorial and Army Volunteer Reserve.
- Major Anthony John Frederick Haywood (361884), Royal Regiment of Artillery.
- Captain (Quartermaster) James Duff Henderson (477203), The Black Watch (Royal Highland Regiment).
- Major (Director of Music) Walter Jackson (462833), The Life Guards, now retired.
- 19041562 Warrant Officer Class I Michael Eugene Lannen, The Loyal Regiment (North Lancashire).
- Major (Quartermaster) Ronald George Lucas (436174), The Queen's Regiment.
- 22246319 Warrant Officer Class II Michael MacNamara, Corps of Royal Engineers.
- Major Douglas George McCord (424398), Royal Irish Rangers (27th (Inniskilling) 83rd and 87th).
- 22863044 Warrant Officer Class II Edward John William Olley, Army Catering Corps.
- 839505 Warrant Officer Class I Robert Leslie Payne, Royal Regiment of Artillery.
- 22225490 Warrant Officer Class II Robert Probert, Royal Army Ordnance Corps.
- Major (Quartermaster) Edward Scott Quinn (468126), 9th/12th Royal Lancers (Prince of Wales's).
- Major Neville Reed (459426), 3rd Carabiniers (Prince of Wales's Dragoon Guards).
- Major Thomas Christopher Patrick Sherry (462723), Royal Army Educational Corps.
- Major Geoffrey Leonard Simcox, MC, TD, (245393), Royal Army Pay Corps.
- Major David Flett Smith, TD, (456857), The Parachute Regiment, Territorial and Army Volunteer Reserve.
- Captain Roger Stanley Pelham Tamlyn (473484), Royal Army Medical Corps.
- Captain Robert Dudley Willcox (470397), Royal Army Ordnance Corps.
- Captain (Quartermaster) Reginald Colin Williams (479662), Royal Army Ordnance Corps.
- Major Mathew John Anthony Wilson (451349), The Light Infantry.
- Captain Yahya Bin Haji Omar (480116), Royal Corps of Signals.
- Major (Acting) Alan Thomas Yorke (474772), Royal Tank Regiment.

Overseas Award

- Warrant Officer Class II Henry William Burnard, The Bermuda Regiment.

Royal Air Force

- Squadron Leader Anthony Ivor Alder (660233).
- Squadron Leader John Andrew Bell (607561).
- Squadron Leader John Richard Bell, DFC, (174006).
- Squadron Leader (Acting Wing Commander) John Lester Clayson (2547208).
- Squadron Leader David Hicham (4111732).
- Squadron Leader Malcolm James Little (3121499).
- Squadron Leader Jack Marshall (568918).
- Squadron Leader Norman Alfred Noyce (127103).
- Squadron Leader Thomas Graham Roland Osborn (4148874), for services with the Kenya Air Force.
- Squadron Leader William Frederick James Stevens, DFC, AFC, (146924).
- Squadron Leader Charles Barry Stribling (504398).
- Squadron Leader Owen James Truelove (609079).
- Squadron Leader William Ernest Waite (2442722), for services with the Royal Malaysian Air Force.
- Squadron Leader John Alan Williams (607058).
- Squadron Leader Donald James Wistow (1851501).
- Squadron Leader Alfred William David Woodcock (195193).
- Squadron Leader Henry Perry Grinham (166565).
- Acting Squadron Leader Arthur Edward Symonds (3206760), Royal Air Force Volunteer Reserve (Training Branch).
- Flight Lieutenant John Shakespeare Allison (608321).
- Flight Lieutenant David John Blackmore (4048031).
- Flight Lieutenant James Jack (4092549).
- Flight Lieutenant Ernest Frederick Wallis (2524523).
- Acting Flight Lieutenant Edwin Samuel Thomas Tout (579391).
- Warrant Officer William Edward Buckley (W2221755).
- Warrant Officer John Henry Davenport, (TO591890).
- Warrant Officer Dennis Beniamin Dixon (SO626264).
- Warrant Officer Stanley William Hamilton-Farey, BEM, (LO529057).
- Warrant Officer John Arthur Garbet (A4004462), RAF Regiment.
- Warrant Officer Cecil Roy Jacobs (CO572363).
- Warrant Officer Michael McDermott (WO535004).
- Warrant Officer Henry Norman Pringle (MO629206).
- Warrant Officer William George Williams (UO637367), RAF Regiment.
- Master Signaller Denis Bernard Shrubb (W3001861).

Civil Division

- Gilbert Adamson, 1st Radio Officer, SS Empress of Canada, Marconi International Marine Co. Ltd.
- Alderman Stanley Lloyd Aldous, Member, Cambridgeshire and Isle of Ely Agricultural Executive Committee.
- Daisy Sybil Emma Aldridge, Senior Nursing Officer, King's Mill Hospital, Sutton-in-Ashfield.
- Russell Allen, lately Chairman, Northern Ireland Committee, Irish Congress of Trade Unions.
- Leonard Charles Allnutt, Chairman, South-Eastern Regional Industrial Savings Committee.
- Philip Andrews, RD, Preventive Officer, Board of Customs and Excise.
- David Annat, Group Chief Pharmacist, Royal Buckinghamshire Hospital Management Committee, Stoke Mandeville Hospital, Aylesbury.
- Francis Irvine Armstrong, Chief Superintendent, Royal Ulster Constabulary.
- Rosslyn Arnott, Chairman, Durham Local Savings Committee.
- Brenda Ashby, Foreign and Commonwealth Office.
- John Roderick Atterton, Deputy Secretary, Royal National Lifeboat Institution.
- Frank Bainbridge, Chief Administrative Assistant, Durham County Council.
- Donald Francis Baker, Chairman, Axminster Rural District Council.
- James Baldwin. For services to mentally and physically disabled people in Oswaldtwistle.
- Joane Hylton Balfe (Miss Joane Bowes), lately Consultant, Leather Research Association. For services to Export.
- William Banks, MC, Personnel Director, The Patent Shaft Steel Works Ltd.
- Stanley Edward Barnes, Secretary, Salaries and Superannuation Department, National Union of Teachers.
- Norah Mavis Barrett. For services to spastics in the Midlands.
- Arthur Hedley Basford, Chief Warning Officer, Maidstone Group, United Kingdom Warning and Monitoring Organisation.
- Robert Christopher Battersby, Sales Director, Associated Engineering (Export Services) Ltd. For services to Export.
- John Beer, European Export Manager, William Heinemann Ltd. For services to Export.
- William George Beevis, Higher Executive Officer, Commonwealth War Graves Commission.
- Ursula Lucie Alice Behr, Principal Child Care Officer, Essex County Council.
- Eva Maude Bestley. For services to the Church Assembly.
- Madeleine Billett, Higher Executive Officer, Department of Health and Social Security.
- Annie Birkenhead. For services to the community in Walton-le-Dale, Lancashire.
- Arthur John Blackwell, Technical Class Grade A (Engineering), Ministry of Defence.
- Joe Blagg, lately Chairman, Nantwich Urban District Council, Cheshire.
- Helen Mary Blundell, lately District Nurse/Midwife, Dormansland, Surrey County Council.
- Arthur Boardman, General Secretary, National Federation of Licensed Victuallers.
- Ernest Stephen Bradshaw, Chief Superintendent, Derby County and Borough Constabulary.
- Alec George Briggs. For services to Youth in Notting Hill and Wimbledon.
- Margaret Winifred Arnold Brooke, Chairman, East Sussex County Nursing Association.
- Arthur Gilbert Brooks, Divisional Officer, Grade I, London Fire Brigade.
- Walter Jack Broome, Chief Officer (Works), London Borough of Baling. For services to Road Safety.
- Sydney Clarence Brown, Senior Assistant County Surveyor (Bridges), Gloucester County Council.
- Henry Charles Francis Browning, lately Chief Reporter, Gloucestershire Echo.
- Edith May Bruce, Councillor, Crosby Borough Council, Lancashire.
- Walter Charles Henry Bugg, Clerical Officer, Ministry of Defence.
- Arthur Bull. Lately Administrative Assistant, Line Maintenance Branch, British Overseas Airways Corporation.
- Edward William Bull, Higher Executive Officer, Ministry of Defence.
- Frank Gordon Burgin, Mechanical and Electrical Engineer, Department of the Environment.
- Marjorie Butler, Executive Officer, Welsh Office.
- Doris Calton, Executive Officer, Ministry of Aviation Supply.
- Alexander Neish Carstairs, Member, Fife County Council.
- Rebecca Geraldine Castledine, Ward Sister, Deermoss Hospital, Whitchurch, Shropshire.
- Stanley Cayton, Chief Public Health Inspector and Cleansing Superintendent, West Bromwich County Borough.
- Alice Chadwick. For social services in Bolton.
- Kenneth Frederick Chapman, Higher Executive Officer, Department of Trade and Industry.
- William Henry Cheverst, Senior Scientific Officer, Ministry of Defence.
- Doris Nield Chew, Honorary Secretary, Mid-Pennine Association for the Arts.
- Leonard Bertram Clark, Senior Executive Officer, Department for National Savings.
- Thomas Wilfred Clarke, Senior Executive Assistant, London Transport Executive.
- William Henry Cole, Personnel and Administration Officer, British Rail Engineering Ltd., Doncaster Works.
- William Charles Coleman, Head Postmaster, Hemel Hempstead, Eastern Postal Region.
- Eldred Albert Edward Coles, Administrative Officer, Kingswood Schools, Bristol.
- Thomas William Coles, lately Member, Winchester Hospital Management Committee.
- Muriel Georgina Cookes, lately Principal, Stanhope Adult Education Institute, London.
- Rhoda Doris Coole, Foreign and Commonwealth Office.
- Edith Mary Coupland, Matron, Whittington Hall Hospital, Chesterfield.
- Robert Walter Coysh, Senior Executive Officer, Metropolitan Police Office.
- The Reverend Canon Benjamin William Crawford, Honorary Secretary, Bedale Local Savings Committee.
- John Crawford. For services to journalism in Bolton.
- Ronald Harry Maurice Creed, District Administrative Officer, Croydon District, South Eastern Electricity Board.
- Zofia Czechowicz, Executive Officer, Department of Health and Social Security.
- Captain Samuel Ernest Dale, Master (Passenger Vessels), Shipping and International Services Division, British Railways Board, Harwich.
- Observer Commander Arthur Dalton, Group Commandant, No. 21 Group, Royal Observer Corps, Preston.
- David Thomas Davies, lately Charge Nurse, St. Lawrence's Hospital, Caterham.
- Idns Hilary Davies, Clerk to the Carmarthenshire Executive Council.
- Stanley Garnet Davies, Grade 3 Officer, Department of Employment.
- James Dean. For services to Highland agriculture.
- Irvine Hubert Dearnley, lately Clerk of the Kingswood Urban District Council, Gloucestershire.
- John Alan Dixon, Chief Officer, Great Yarmouth Fire Brigade.
- Harold Doidge, General Manager, South Wales East and Monmouthshire Trustee Savings Bank.
- John Carlisle Nanson Donald. For political services in the North of England.
- John Leonard Down, Executive Officer, Science Research Council.
- Herbert Cooper Driffill, Chairman, Grimsby, Scunthorpe and District War Pensions Committee.
- Marjorie May Dunn, Headmistress, Friarage Hospital Special School, Northallerton.
- William Arthur Eley, Works Manager, Remploy Ltd., Spennymoor.
- David Henry Matthew Elliott, Director, Belfast Branch, British Red Cross Society.
- James Ronald Elliott, lately Group Secretary, East Birmingham Hospital Management Committee.
- Lucy Beryl Ellis, Secretary, Children's Country Holidays Fund.
- Joan Belissa Emdin, Higher Executive Officer, Ministry of Defence.
- Sydney Thomas Evans, Docks Manager, Port Talbot, British Transport Docks Board.
- John Arthur Fearne, lately Secretary, Transport Users Consultative Committees for Yorkshire and the North East.
- Joan Elsie Field, Chief Officer (Southern Region), Girls' Nautical Training Corps.
- Alexander Findlay, Depute Chief Constable, Scottish North-Eastern Counties Constabulary.
- Andrew Fleming, Generation Engineer, Garry/Moriston Group, North of Scotland Hydro-Electric Board.
- Charles Maurice Wainewright Sandford Freeman, lately Honorary Secretary, Wandsworth Borough Savings Committee.
- Alexander Fullarton, lately Superintendent, Head Post Office, Glasgow.
- Albert Galbraith, Superintendent, Motor Accessory Division, Smiths Industries Ltd.
- John Brown McEwan Gall. For political services in Scotland.
- Joan Pearl Gardner, Foreign and Commonwealth Office.
- Leonard Francis Garner, Deputy Chief Engineer, Eastern Gas Board.
- Harold Leslie George Gibson, General Secretary, National Union of Hosiery and Knitwear Workers.
- Joyce Kathleen Gilliam, lately Foreign and Commonwealth Office.
- William Edward John Gillings, Head of Electrical Engineering Design, British Aircraft Corporation Ltd., Bristol.
- Marion Lilias Gilmour, Grade 4 Officer, Department of Employment.
- John Edmond Ginty, Site Welfare Officer, Heavy Organic Chemicals Division, Imperial Chemical Industries Ltd., Wilton.
- James Joseph Glover, Director and Secretary, North Staffordshire Chamber of Commerce and Industry. For services to Export.
- Norman George Goddard, Higher Executive Officer, Department of Health and Social Security.
- John Goepel, Social Development Officer, Crawley.
- Edward Gold Ing, Senior Executive Officer, Department of the Environment.
- Benjamin Goodwin, Clerical Officer, Ministry of Aviation Supply.
- Eileen Graham, Chief Nursing Officer, Londonderry County Borough.
- Montague Sidney Graham, Clerk to the Trustees, Morden College, Blackheath.
- Francis Joseph Gray, Divisional Fire Officer, British Airports Authority, Heathrow Airport.
- Joyce Alexandra Grebby, Centre Organiser, Poole, Women's Royal Voluntary Service.
- Jack Greenwood, Safety Officer (Industrial), Scandura Ltd., British Belting and Asbestos Group Ltd.
- David Frederick Griffiths. For public and local government services in Blaina, Monmouthshire.
- Joan Anne Grimsley, Head Teacher, Four Oaks County Junior School, Sutton Coldfield.
- Stanley Alfred Guy, lately General Manager, Birmingham Municipal Bank.
- Alice Haines, Alderman, Accrington Borough Council.
- William Ritson Hakin, Senior Executive Officer, Department of Health and Social Security.
- Elfrida Hales, Higher Executive Officer, Department of Education and Science.
- Mary Hamilton, Senior Probation Officer, Inner London Probation and After-Care Service.
- George William Hammond. For services to ex-servicemen.
- William Hardman, Senior Executive Officer, Board of Inland Revenue.
- John Diamond Harkness, Sports Journalist, The Sunday Post.
- William Jabez Harper, Senior Executive Officer, Department of Health and Social Security.
- Robert Hart, Member, Newtownabbey Urban District Council, County Antrim.
- Rebecca Haynes, lately Senior Nurse Tutor, United Liverpool Hospitals.
- Raymond Albert Heavens, Senior Executive Officer, Paymaster General's Office.
- Edwin Oswald Hector, Chairman, Visiting Committee, Edinburgh Prison.
- Annie Mary Leggat Hegarty, lately Secretary to Counsel for Private Legislation Procedure, Scotland.
- Constance Roberta Henson, Principal, St. Loyes School of Occupational Therapy, Devon.
- George David Herbage, Managing Director, Aircraft and Instrument Demisting Ltd. For services to Export.
- Marion Emile Herbertson, Sister-in-Charge of the Renal Unit, Edinburgh Royal Infirmary.
- John Douglas Herd, lately Chairman, Cumberland, Westmorland and Furness Spastic Society.
- Evelyn Mary Braz Hobbs, Matron, Somerset Farm Institute, Cannington.
- Norman Henry Fryer Hoggins, Commander, Metropolitan Police.
- George Charles Holmes. For services to local government in Swadlincote, Derbyshire.
- Annie Isobel Horn, Editor, Scottish Home and Country.
- Ronald Horsley, Chairman, Wolverhampton Savings Committee.
- Theresa Hothersall, Chief Nursing Officer, Burnley and District Hospital Management Committee.
- Marjorie Grace Humby, Director of Junior Department, Royal College of Music.
- Howard James Iles, Production Manager, Courtaulds Ltd., Coventry.
- Dorothy Davidson James, Group Adviser and Health Visitor, Cumberland.
- William Robert Antony James, Assistant Equipment Manager, Bloodhound, Guided Weapons Division, British Aircraft Corporation, Bristol. For services to Export.
- Alfred Henry Jefferd, Grade 4 Officer, Department of Employment.
- Hubert Jenkins, Honorary Secretary, Belfast Council Schools' Savings Committee.
- Harold Vivian Jesson, Founder and lately Honorary Secretary of Coventry Branch, Grenadier Guards Association.
- Jane Johnson, Ward Sister, Banstead Hospital, Surrey.
- William Johnston, Chairman, Dumfries-shire Savings Committee.
- Catherine Margaret Jones, Senior Mistress, John Bright Junior School, Llandudno.
- Edwin John Jones, Engineer III, Ministry of Defence.
- Harold Bernard Jones, Honorary Secretary, Hemel Hempstead Savings Committee.
- Richard Albert Jones, Senior Conservation Officer, Welsh Folk Museum, St. Fagans.
- William John Jones, Tax Officer (Higher Grade), Board of Inland Revenue.
- Helen Margaret Alison Keen, Group Head Medical Social Worker, Glasgow Royal Infirmary and associated hospitals.
- George Kellett, Chief Building Executive, English Industrial Estates Corporation.
- Alderman Thomas Henry Kenley, lately Traffic Superintendent, Cumberland Motor Services Ltd.
- Marjorie Kenyon, Personal Assistant to the Chief Executive Officer, Blackburn County Borough Council.
- Robert John Kerr, Chief Superintendent, Royal Ulster Constabulary.
- Agnes Norah King, Headmistress, Longmoor County Infants School, Hampshire.
- James Anthony Lane, Contracts Manager, The Fram Group Ltd.
- Gladys Muriel Law, Personal Secretary, Ministry of Agriculture, Fisheries and Food.
- Herbert Arthur Leach, Secretary, Post Office Orphan Homes Benevolent Institution.
- Harold Osmond Le Druillenec, Headmaster, St. John's School, Jersey.
- Geoffrey Lesson, Secretary, National Vegetable Research Station, Wellesbourne, Warwick.
- Muriel Gertrude Linton, Vice-Chairman, Lisburn Rural District Council, County Antrim.
- John Warwick Lloyd, Chairman, Bridgnorth Youth Employment Committee.
- John Loudon, Staff Officer, Board of Inland Revenue.
- Stirrat Love, lately Operations Control Superintendent, German Division, British European Airways.
- Margaret MacDonald, Higher Executive Officer, Scottish Office.
- Donald John McInnes, Special Assistant Teacher, Kirkwall Grammar School and Stromness Academy, Orkney.
- William John Clark Gold McIntosh, Inspector of Taxes (Higher Grade), Board of Inland Revenue.
- Duncan MacIver, Establishment Officer, Scottish Headquarters, Department of the Environment.
- Alexander MacLachlan, MB, ChB. For services to St. Andrew's Ambulance Association, Cowlairs, Glasgow.
- Jemima McLauchlan, Matron, Church of Scotland Eventide Home, Crieff, Perthshire.
- Callum Macpherson Macleod, Headmaster, Crown Primary School, Inverness.
- John MacPherson, DFC, Chairman of Village Committee and Commandant, Games Village, 1970 Commonwealth Games.
- Esther Heeley Mager, Executive Officer, Ministry of Defence.
- Deirdre Margary. For political services in the South East.
- Alderman George Robert Marshall, Chairman, Brent and Harrow War Pensions Committee.
- George Ablett Mason, Assistant Chief Officer, Leicestershire and Rutland Fire Brigade.
- Olive Honor Rose Matcham, Midwifery Sister, Churchill Hospital, Oxford.
- Armour Bernard Matthewson, Senior Executive Officer, Department of Health and Social Security.
- Arthur Crawford Mayer, MB, ChB, General Practitioner, Tarbert, Loch Fyne, Argyll.
- William Leonard Mees, Senior Executive Officer, Department of Health and Social Security.
- James Cowing Middleton, Chairman, Great Yarmouth and District Local Employment Committee.
- Frank Ernest Miles, Clerk to the South East London and Kent Executive Council.
- Josephine Moffet, Organising Secretary for Northern Ireland, Forces Help Society and Lord Roberts' Workshops.
- Ethel Monk, lately Theatre Superintendent, West London Hospital.
- Evelyn Mary Moody. For services to the community in Liverpool.
- Eric Moore, Personal Assistant to the Group Managing Director (Automotive and Subsidiary Companies) Rolls-Royce Ltd.
- Margaret Elizabeth Moreland, Company Manager and Secretary, Welsh National Opera Company Ltd.
- David Herbert Morgan, Chairman, South Wales Educational Savings Committee.
- Leonard George Morgan, Chief Forester, Forestry Commission.
- Philip Stuart Morrison, Assistant Firemaster, South Western Area Fire Brigade (Scotland).
- Edward Charles Mortimer, Manager, Overseas Engineering Department, Dexion Ltd. For services to Export.
- Jane Vivien Morton. For political services.
- Captain James Alan Muirhead. For political and public services in the South West.
- Rodney George Mullan, Farmer, Dungannon, County Tyrone.
- Stanley Murfin, Shorthand Writer, South Wales Traffic Area.
- Kathleen Ida Murray. For services to Music in Elgin.
- Lily Nahum, lately Medical Secretary, Salford Royal Hospital.
- Idris George Nicholls, Senior Contracts Manager, Rowlinson Constructions Ltd.
- George William Nixon, Deputy Principal, Ministry of Home Affairs for Northern Ireland.
- Irene Mabel Norbury, BEM, Honorary Secretary, Liverpool Street Groups Savings Committee.
- Keith Norridge, Technical Class Grade B, United Kingdom Atomic Energy Authority.
- Stanley Victor Oldham, Regional Catering Adviser, Newcastle Regional Hospital Board.
- John Granville Charles Oliver, Principal Assistant to Commercial Manager, Welsh Industrial Estates Corporation.
- Kevin Denis O'Riordan, Officer, Board of Customs and Excise.
- Dorothy Mary Othen, Honorary Secretary, Southampton Street Groups Savings Committee.
- William Hamilton Owens, Labour Manager, Cammell Laird & Co. (Shipbuilders & Engineers) Ltd.
- Margery Joan Morton-Palmer, County Secretary, Wiltshire, St. John Ambulance Association and Brigade.
- Wilfred Reginald Harry Palmer, Higher Executive Officer, Department of Trade and Industry.
- Dennis Parkes, Editorial Director, Factory Publications Ltd.
- William John Parkman, lately Regional Co-ordinator, No. 8 Regional Crime Squad.
- Leonard Patrick, Secretary, West Midland Division, Freight Transport Association.
- Richard Dudley Pendlebury, Head of Secretariat, British Broadcasting Corporation.
- Phyllis Eileen Petherick, Foreign and Commonwealth Office.
- Doris Grace Effie Pettifor. For political and public services in Wales.
- Harry William Phillips, Chief Purchasing Officer, Export Packing Service Group of Companies, Sittingbourne. For services to Export.
- John Frederick Phillips, Bookshop Manager, HM Stationery Office.
- John Place, Chief Superintendent, Surrey Constabulary.
- Gladys Plumley, lately Secretary, Swindon and District Council of Social Service.
- Jean Miller Pollard, Member, Northwich Rural District Council, Cheshire.
- Phyllis Pope, President, Yorkshire Women's Amateur Athletic Association.
- George William Powley, Executive Officer, Crown Agents for Oversea Governments and Administrations.
- Phyllis Preston. For political services.
- Margery Schollick Procter. For services to the community in Blackburn.
- Dorothy Marguerite Prowse, Headmistress, Dean Row County Junior School, Wilmslow.
- Ivor Charles Pursey. For services to local government and the community in Cardiganshire.
- Nesta Bartle Pye. For political services in Wessex.
- William Geoffrey Pye, Deputy Registrar of Non-Participating Employments.
- Sarah Rabinowitz, Chairman, Birmingham Central Synagogue Ladies' Guild.
- Winifred Lilian Raby. For services to the art of Greek Lace-making in Lancashire.
- Anne Buchannan Alexander Ramsay, Member, Midlothian Local Savings Committee.
- Janet Baillie Ramsay, Head, Payrolls and Invoices Section, South of Scotland Electricity Board.
- Leonard Gwynfryn Morgan Rees, Operations Officer Grade II, Department of Trade and Industry.
- Charles Alfred Reeves, Principal Clerk, Legal and Parliamentary Department, Greater London Council.
- Ruth Hanson Reid. For political and public services in Wessex.
- Matilda Mary Remington, Senior Registry Clerk, Advisory Services Division, Council for Small Industries in Rural Areas.
- Clara Bremner Retallack, Headmistress, Michaelstow Junior and Infants' School, St. Tudy, Cornwall.
- Elizabeth Rhind, Matron, Tippethill Hospital, Bathgate.
- Raymond Clifford Rickaby, Local Manager, J. Roxby Surtees Ltd., Catterick.
- Colin Elston Rigby, Secretary, North Western Section, Federation of Civil Engineering Contractors.
- John William Rimington, Deputy Director (Administration), Scottish South Area, National Coal Board.
- Richard Archer Robb. For services to the community in County Armagh.
- Frank Tudor Roberts, Joint Managing Director, Bridge of Weir Leather Co. Ltd., Renfrewshire. For services to Export.
- John Owen Roberts, Secretary and General Manager, South Caernarvon Creameries Ltd.
- Harold Robinson, Honorary National Secretary, 1940 Dunkirk Veterans' Association.
- Beatrice Ena May Royal, Matron, Thorpe Maternity Hospital, Easington, County Durham.
- Bernard Charles Sadler, Master Builder. For services to the Cathedral at Bury St. Edmunds.
- William Lewis Sambrook, Chairman, Monmouthshire Social Security Local Advisory Committee.
- Frederick Frank Sargent, Chief Superintendent, Metropolitan Police.
- Anne Dorothy Christian Scott. For services to the community in Easingwold, York.
- Eileen Maude Sheath, Chief Superintendent of Typists, Central Office of Information.
- Norman Edward Sheldon, Secretary, Trustee Savings Banks Inspection Committee.
- Thomas Cropper Ryley Shepherd, Managing Director and Chairman, Haigh Engineering Co. Ltd., Ross-on-Wye. For services to Export.
- Marguerita Barbara Sherwood. For services to the community in Wandsworth and district.
- Joan Margaret Shilston, Private Secretary to the Director-General, Independent Television Authority.
- George Shooter. For services to the British Legion in Mansfield.
- Donald William Henry Simmons, Port Auxiliary Service Officer, Medway District.
- Harry Smallwood, Chairman, North Staffordshire Social Security Local Advisory Committee.
- Ernest Murray Smith, Senior Executive Officer, Department of Trade and Industry for Scotland.
- Norman Dennis Smith, Senior Experimental Officer, National Institute of Oceanography.
- Walter Smith, Chairman, Islington Social Security Local Advisory Committee.
- Walter Victor Smith, Senior Traffic Examiner, Department of the Environment.
- John Spensley, Member, Skipton District Committee, Yorkshire (West Riding) Agricultural Executive Committee.
- Blanche Muriel Spring (The Reverend Mother Mary Francis), Superior General, Franciscan Sisters of the Divine Motherhood.
- Constance Emily Staple, lately Clerical Officer, Ministry of Defence.
- Derrick Vere Staynor, Chief Development Engineer, Mobile Radar Division, Elliott-Automation Radar Systems Ltd., Borehamwood.
- James Bingham Stewart, lately Principal, Finiston Primary School, Belfast.
- Leslie Stewart, Fisheries Officer, Lancashire River Authority.
- Jean Marshall Stone, Technical Adviser, Organising Committee, 3rd Commonwealth Paraplegic Games.
- Thomas Embleton Stothard, Assistant Technical Officer, Department of the Environment.
- Leonard Tatham Stowell, Group Works Study Officer, Northern Spinning Division, Courtaulds Ltd., Maple Hill.
- Dorothea Strover. For services to disabled people at Woodlarks, Farnham, Surrey.
- Thomas Gordon Sutherland, Executive Officer, Board of Customs and Excise.
- Laura Emily Swatton. For services to the Scottish Area, Royal Air Forces Association.
- Jeana Elizabeth Tate, head of public relations department, Women's Royal Voluntary Service.
- Donald McLean Taylor, chief engineer, David MacBrayne Ltd., Glasgow.
- Leslie Jackson Taylor, senior executive officer, Department of Health and Social Security.
- Sophie Antonina Pauline Teichfeld, lately Foreign and Commonwealth Office.
- Thomas Bowen Thomas, general secretary, National Society of Brushmakers.
- Edward Victor Christopher Thompson, chief illustrator, Home Office.
- James Murray Thomson, farm manager, West of Scotland Agricultural College.
- The Reverend William George Millar Thomson, DD, director of Belfast Branch, The Samaritans.
- Laurence Stephen Thorne, export sales manager, Dent Allcroft Ltd. For services to Export.
- Albert Todd, chief superintendent, West Yorkshire Constabulary.
- James Hilary Peter Tonge. For services to local government in Monifieth, Dundee.
- Lieutenant-Colonel Frederick Henry Towill, TD, Chairman, Bristol Supplementary Benefit Appeals Tribunal.
- John Hubert Trounson, Mining Consultant, Camborne Tin Ltd., Cornwall.
- Annie Helen Nairn Turner, lately Senior Lecturer, Edinburgh College of Art.
- William Tracey Turner, Assistant Education Officer (Special Education), Lancashire County Council.
- John Davy Udal, Managing Director, J. P. Udal Ltd., Birmingham.
- Harry Usher, Export Executive, Gillette Industries Ltd. For services to Export.
- Sidney Francis Utting, Member, Building and Civil Engineering Regional Joint Committee.
- Edward Wallace Wade, Trustee, Catholic Housing Aid Society.
- Frank Fanthorpe Wadsworth, Inspector of Taxes (Higher Grade), Board of Inland Revenue.
- Colonel Frank Walden, DL, Retired Officer, Grade II, Ministry of Defence.
- Douglas Wallace, Production Manager, Armament Division, Vickers Ltd. (Engineering Group), Newcastle upon Tyne.
- Thomas Henry Edward Waller, lately Clerical Officer, Public Trustee Office.
- Elsie May Walmsley, Headmistress, Victoria Infants' School, Hong Kong.
- Roy Frederick Wyndham Walwin, Chairman, Frome and District Local Savings Committee.
- Harry Ward, Head Chief Technician, Division of Immunological Products Control, National Institute for Medical Research.
- Dennis Robert James Warren, Estate Manager, Henley-on-Thames.
- Kenneth Watkins. For services to the Devon Trust for Nature Conservation Ltd.
- Leslie Joseph Watson, Senior Field Adviser, Countryside Commission.
- Kenneth Anthony Wheeldon, Marketing Director, Sonicaid Ltd., Pagham, Sussex. For services to Export.
- Hilda Evelyn Wilce, Superintendent of Specialist Teleprinter Operators, Ministry of Defence.
- John Raymond Wilding, Senior Executive Officer, Board of Inland Revenue.
- Islwyn Williams, Higher Executive Officer, Ministry of Defence.
- John Leslie Ridge-Winfield, Divisional Pests Officer, Ministry of Agriculture, Fisheries and Food.
- George Edward Winterburn, lately Senior Executive Engineer, North Eastern Telecommunications Region, Post Office.
- John Clark Wiseman, lately Chairman of Board of Management, Buchan Hospitals, North Aberdeenshire.
- Maurice Cecil Featherstone Witty, lately Engineer Grade III, Ministry of Defence.
- Albert William Wood, lately Senior Executive Officer, Office of the Registrar of Restrictive Trading Agreements.
- Charles Barrington Bishop Wood, Head of Image Scanning Section, Research Department, British Broadcasting Corporation.
- Arthur Worthy, Headmaster, Ifield Junior School, Crawley, Sussex.
- Pauline Elsie Wren, Superintendent, Birmingham City Police.
- Arthur Wright. For services to the community in Sheffield.
- Bessie Wright, Principal, Waverley College of Further Education, Nottingham.
- Eileen Yewdall, President, Yorkshire Federation of Women's Institutes.
- Dorothy Profit Young, lately Group Personnel Manager, English Calico Ltd.
- Helen Theodora Young, Organist and Director of the Choir at the Chapel of the Royal Hospital, Chelsea.

Diplomatic Service and Overseas List

- Maisie Alicia Azevedo, Senior Personal Secretary, Hong Kong.
- Guy Adonis Banks, District Commissioner, Lesser Islands, Cayman Islands.
- Rose Barnes, Second Secretary (Information), HM Embassy, Bonn.
- Evelyn Jean Birney, Shorthand-Typist, HM Embassy, Washington.
- Graham Boiling, Chief Immigration Officer, British High Commission, New Delhi.
- Brian Angus Buchanan. For services to British cultural interests in Japan.
- Lewis William Bush. For services to British cultural interests in Japan.
- Ronald Robert Capie, British Vice-Consul (Commercial), Seattle.
- Ruth Minetta Capstick, Clerk, British Deputy High Commission, Karachi.
- Christopher Peter Carter, Third Secretary, HM Embassy, Amman.
- Lawrence Harold Chandler, MB, ChB, lately Missionary Doctor, Gwoza Hospital, Northern Nigeria.
- Marjorie Greenhill Chappell, formerly London Representative of the University of Ibadan, Nigeria.
- Cho Shiu-chung. For services to the community in Hong Kong.
- The Reverend Lucien Edward Churnside. For services to the British community in Nicaragua.
- Iris May Clingham, Head Teacher, Education Department, Saint Helena.
- Cecil Walter Coard. For public services in Grenada.
- Douglas Stewart Corner, Manager/Secretary, British Solomon Islands Protectorate Copra Board.
- John Douglas Charlton Cowl, DFC. For services to British interests in Bilbao.
- Walter Cranfield, lately Manager, Obudu Cattle Ranch, South Eastern State, Nigeria.
- Mary Elizabeth Crow, lately Accountant, British High Commission, Lusaka.
- Iris Almeria Davis, Senior Public Health Nurse, Bermuda.
- Alfred James Desoiza, Senior Labour Officer, Department of Labour and Social Security, Gibraltar.
- William Ferdinand Dore, Labour Commissioner, Saint Christopher-Nevis-Anguilla.
- Eric Cecil Duncan, Administrative Assistant, Public Health Department, Saint Helena.
- Ruth Emily Kelsall Duncombe, Principal, St. Mary's Secondary School, Kuching.
- Bernard Dyer, Resident Engineer, Electricity Corporation of Nigeria.
- Olivia Barbara Eachus, Secretary to HM Consul-General, Boston.
- Thomas Eckersley, lately Chief Mechanical Engineer, Sabah State Railways.
- John Cecil Endersby, lately Grade 9 Officer, British High Commission, Lagos.
- Henry Walter Foot, Senior Assistant Secretary, Ministry of Finance, Malawi.
- Dennis Haley Foster, Senior Administrative Officer (Assistant Administrator), Cayman Islands.
- Alexander George Fowler. For services to British commercial interests in Kuwait.
- Donald McKenzie Fraser. For services to British interests in Sudan.
- Angela Dorothea Fuller, MB, BChir, Medical Officer, Royal Victoria Hospital, The Gambia.
- Aldo Anthony Angelo Gattoni, Consul (Commercial), HM Consulate-General, Milan.
- John David Gibbs, formerly Agronomist, Malkerns Research Station, Swaziland.
- Charles Gordon Gibson. For services to British interests in Mauritius.
- John Redman Goldsack, lately Head, Land Development Division, Ministry of Agriculture, Kenya.
- Robert Geldard Goodban, MC, Second Secretary (Administration), HM Embassy, Rio de Janeiro.
- Marcus Bennett Hardaker, lately Superintendent, Malaysian Police Force.
- James Aveline Hendrick, lately Assistant Director of Agriculture (Education Branch), Sarawak.
- Gabriel Hoareau, Chief Health Inspector, Seychelles.
- Marjorie Houghton, lately Headquarters Field Officer, British Red Cross Society, Botswana.
- Gordon James Thomas Peach Housley. For services to British interests in the Middle East.
- Alwyn Josiah Jacobs, Comptroller of Customs, Montserrat.
- Sylda Lucia Lloyd Jones. For services to the British community in Santiago.
- William Robin Lindsay-Stewart, lately Assistant Secretary, Department of Health, Ministry of Labour and Social Services, Zambia.
- Frank Patrick John Lynch, Grade 9 Officer, HM Embassy, Rome.
- Edgar Charles McGahan. For services to British cultural interests in Poland.
- Norman Edward McKenzie, Mechanical Superintendent, Agricultural Department, British Honduras.
- Leila Ailsa Mackintosh, Personal Assistant to HM Ambassador, Kinshasa.
- Margaret Frances May Macpherson, Senior Lecturer, Department of English, Makerere University, Uganda.
- Yvonne Maginley, Secretary, Antigua Tourist Board.
- Edmund Claude Maguire, Executive Engineer (Water Development), Public Works Department, Sarawak.
- Bertram Alexander Manuel, Clerk of Courts, Turks and Caicos Islands.
- Victoria Eleanor Marden. For voluntary social work in Pakistan.
- Dora Margaret Matthews, HM Vice-Consul, Port Elizabeth.
- Mau Kei-on. For services to the community in Hong Kong.
- Malcolm John Fulton Morris, Principal Administrative Officer, Ministry of Works, Power and Communications, Swaziland.
- John Thomas O'Neil, Grade 9 Officer, HM Embassy, Amman.
- Robert Frederick Nichol Patterson. For services to British interests in Sudan.
- William Albert Pink, lately Grade 9 Officer, HM Embassy, Amman.
- Marie Joseph Marcel Maurice Pitchen, Commercial Attaché and Vice-Consul, British Embassy, Tananarive.
- Mary de Murat Quintella, Commercial Archivist, HM Embassy, Rio de Janeiro.
- Moya Rea. For services to music in Hong Kong.
- Leonardo Maria Remedios, British Vice-Consul, Lourenco Marques.
- Roger Beech Royle, General Manager, Government Smallholders Tea Authority Scheme, Malawi.
- Allan Garfield Simmons. For public services in Saint Lucia.
- Cooper Eric Smith, lately Chief Engineer, East African Airways.
- Elizabeth Joan Gee Smyth, lately Senior Sister Tutor, Kenya School of Nursing.
- James Stark, lately Second Secretary (Administration), HM Embassy, Saigon.
- Denis Quibell Stephenson. For services to British cultural interests in Switzerland.
- The Reverend Eritaia Tabutoa, Chairman, Gilbert Islands Protestant Church.
- John Tarbit, Chief Works Supervisor, Ministry of Works and Supplies, Malawi.
- Stephen Julian Tennent, Senior District Officer, Botswana.
- Charles Beatty Allenby Haig Thirlwell, Officer-in-Charge, Government Gunpowder Depot, Hong Kong.
- Francis Tien Yuan-hao. For services to trade and industry in Hong Kong.
- Louise Tirant, Inspector of Schools, Seychelles.
- Charles Walter James Turnbull, Senior Inspector of Mines, Uganda.
- Bruce Oswald Edward Tynes, Deputy Director of Immigration, Freeport, Bahama Islands.
- Frederick James Wakeford, DSM, lately Assistant Chief Fire Officer, Hong Kong Fire Services.
- William Whalley, Public Safety Officer Grade I, British Military Government, Berlin.
- Joan White, Personal Secretary, Geological Survey and Mines Department, Swaziland.
- Alan Thomas Whitehead, Assistant Director (Telecommunications), Botswana.
- Edmund Edison Williams. For services to the community in Nevis.
- Ramsay Albert William Wright, Second Secretary and Vice-Consul, HM Embassy, Jedda.
- Yeung Tak-wah, Senior Class Clerk, Medical and Health Department, Hong Kong.

State of New South Wales

- William Edwin Agland. For services to the community.
- Robert Hill Beddie. For services to the community.
- Stanley Carberry. For services to the community.
- Horace Sylvester Cross. For services to ex-servicemen.
- Councillor Thomas Darmody. For services to local government in Monaro.
- Reginald Walter Hawkins. For services to the community.
- Heath Howell, MM. For services to the community in Warringah.
- Phyllis Helen McKeon. For services to the community.
- Robert Bruce Mulquiney. For services to the community.
- Gordon Andrew Patterson, ED. For services to ex-servicemen.
- Thomas John Smith. For services to sport.
- Oswald Leopold Ziegler. For services to publishing.

State of Victoria

- Alice Mabel Aldous, of St. Kilda. For services to the community.
- Councillor George Archer, of Chewton. For services to the community.
- Arthur Crawford Callander, of Wangaratta. For services to the community.
- Keith Cole, of Daylesford. For services to the community.
- Gerald Francis John Dart, of Ballarat. For services to education.
- Jessie Doris Hayter, of Elsternwick. For services to the community.
- Walter Max Leopold Lippman, of Glen Iris. For services to the community.
- Councillor Hugh Finlay McCay, of Neerim. For services to the community.
- Councillor Victor Stuart McComb, of Frankston. For services to the community.
- Marjorie Grace Miles, of Swan Hill. For services to the community.
- Councillor George Frederick Rae, of Narre Warren North. For services to the community.
- Councillor Wilhelm Waldemar Schodde, of Murtoa. For services to the community.
- Irene Helen Stanley, of Geelong. For services to the British and Foreign Bible Society.
- Juliet May Turner, of Melbourne. For services to the community.
- Emmanuel Kenneth Wilde, of Merino. For services to the community.

State of Queensland

- Benjamin Anderson, of Bundaberg. For meritorious service to the Queensland sugar industry.
- Percy Alexander William Anthony, of Brisbane. For outstanding services to the electricity supply industry of Queensland.
- Mary Theresa Barry, of Dalby. For philanthropic activities.
- Clifford John Donohue, of Boulia. For services to the community and to local government.
- Kathleen Sara Emmerson, of Chinchilla. For services to the community.
- Hugh Hector Innes Noble Innes, of Gin Gin. For services to the grazing industry and to the community.
- Joseph Phillip Kahler, of Corinda. For services to agricultural education.

State of South Australia

- Victor Cromwell, JP, of Mypolonga. For services to local government and to the community.
- Gladys Elphick, of Adelaide. For services to the Aboriginal people.
- John William Forrester, of Prospect. For services to sport.
- Clifford Frederick Sorrell, of Plympton Park. For services to music.
- Elsie Jean Stone, of West Richmond. For services to the Association of Civilian Widows.

State of Western Australia

- Edward William Black. For services to music.
- George Spencer Compton, of Goldfields. For services to the community.
- Graham Farmer, of Triggs. For services to Australian football.
- Albert Owen Howes, JP. For services to ex-servicemen.
- John Allan Johnston, of Perth. For services to the promotion of sport for paraplegics.
- Terence Gerald Millsteed, JP. For long and meritorious service to local government in Goomalling.
- Albert Edward White. For services to local government.

State of Tasmania

- Sister Agnes Clara Mackenzie, of Burnie. For services to the community.
- Evelyn Beatrice Propsting, of Scottsdale. For services to the community.
- Allen William Purkiss, Chief Officer of the New Norfolk Fire Brigade.

=== Order of the Companions of Honour (CH) ===
- Sir (Cecil) Maurice Bowra. For services to Literature.

=== Companion of the Imperial Service Order (ISO) ===
Home Civil Service

- Sydney George Baker, Senior Chief Executive Officer, Home Office.
- Marshall Lindsay Barclay, Assistant Chief Valuer, Scotland, Board of Inland Revenue.
- Charles Bertram Selby-Boothroyd, TD, Principal, Department of Trade and Industry.
- Leo Vincent Byrne, Assistant Director, Research and Organisation, Quality Assurance Division, Ministry of Aviation Supply.
- Alec Charles Edmond Cook, Chief Executive Officer, Lord Chancellor's Department.
- Robert William Howard Cook, Superintending Grade, General Scientific and Technical Branch, Department of Health and Social Security.
- James Edwin Dowell, Senior Inspector of Taxes, Board of Inland Revenue.
- Maurice John Gilbert, Superintendent Mechanical Engineer, Ministry of Defence.
- Eric Reginald Gordon, Principal, Department of the Environment.
- Laurie Gordon Hiddleston, lately Regional Director, Eastern Mediterranean Region, Ministry of Public Building and Works.
- Ronald Francis Johnson, Deputy Secretary, National Savings Committee for Scotland.
- William James McCarthy, Chief Experimental Officer, Ministry of Defence.
- Walter Scott Mackay, MRCVS, Divisional Veterinary Officer, Ministry of Agriculture, Fisheries and Food.
- John Major Makin, Chief Executive Officer, Department of Health and Social Security.
- Douglas Holgate Morris, lately Clerk to the Traffic Commissioners, Scottish Traffic Area, Ministry of Transport.
- Leonard John Morris, Principal Executive Officer, Ministry of Defence.
- Richard Edmund Skilbeck, Principal Inspector, Board of Customs and Excise.
- Cyril Stagg, ERD, Senior Mechanical and Electrical Engineer, Department of the Environment
- Sydney George Surman, Senior Chief Executive Officer, Ministry of Aviation Supply.
- Arthur Percy Timms, Principal, Department of Trade and Industry.
- Ronald Henry Treadwell, lately Chief Experimental Officer, Ministry of Defence.
- Cyril Leslie Sinclair Williams, Foreign and Commonwealth Office.

Diplomatic Service and Overseas List

- Cecil George Folwell, Postmaster General, Hong Kong.
- Lai Ko-nin, Liaison Officer Class I, Secretariat for Home Affairs, Hong Kong.
- Robert Gerald Roberts, lately Administrative Officer Class "A", Gilbert and Ellice Islands Colony.
- Ira Marcus Simmons, MBE, Permanent Secretary, Ministry of Education, Saint Lucia.

State of New South Wales

- Edward William Howitt. For services to the state.

State of Queensland

- Frederick Allan Manning, CVO, of Brisbane. For dedicated service to the Government of Queensland.

State of Western Australia

- Thomas Charles Dunne. Director of Agriculture in Western Australia.

=== British Empire Medal (BEM) ===
Military Division

Royal Navy

- Marine Engineering Artificer (P) Chief William Alfred Beale, D/M 928909.
- Chief Marine Engineering Artificer (H) Ronald William James Beresford, D/MX 897239.
- Chief Engineering Mechanic Arnold Briggs, P/KX 780116.
- Ordnance Electrical Artificer (L) First Class Gordon Reginald Percy Buckle, P/MX 54488.
- Chief Petty Officer (CD1) Edward Butler, P/JX 159729.
- Mechanician First Class James Gageby Crawford, D/KX 770132.
- Colour Sergeant James Edward Dillon, CH/X 4142, Royal Marines.
- Chief Radio Supervisor James William Edge, D/JX 371352.
- Chief Petty Officer Writer Albert Victor Hawkes, P/MX 57201.
- Chief Petty Officer Cook Thomas James Kirby, MX 62925.
- Chief Marine Engineering Artificer (H) Michael John Lewis, P/MX 855908.
- Chief Petty Officer (GA1) Arthur Frank Lilley, P/JX 51956.
- Chief Petty Officer (GI) Donald Patrick Macdonald, P/JX 904387.
- Chief Ordnance Electrical Artificer (O) Raymond Merrix, P/MX 666642.
- Chief Petty Officer Stores Accountant Michael Miller, D/MX 820477.
- Colour Sergeant (C) George Edward Morley, R.M. 15477, Royal Marines.
- Petty Officer Engineering Mechanic Keith Albert Mould, P/JX 871951 (formerly on loan to the Royal Malaysian Navy).
- Chief Petty Officer (TASI) George Sneddon Munro, P/JX 170232.
- Colour Sergeant James Munson, R.M. 10957, Royal Marines.
- Chief Marine Engineering Artificer (H) James Herbert Norman, P/MX 55704.
- Chief Wren Violet Mary Parry, 727.
- Chief Electrician (Air) Alfred Paul Pickersgill, L/FX 75420.
- Chief Aircraft Artificer (A/E) Desmond Arthur Quick, FX 100236.
- Chief Wren (R/S) Joan Naomi Rogers, FW 185.
- Chief Petty Officer Derek Ian Southern, P/JX 820049.
- Quartermaster Sergeant (K) David Thomas, R.M. 12838, Royal Marines.
- Marine Engineering Artificer (H) First Class Kenneth Alfred Tucker, P/MX 803740 (formerly on loan to the Royal Malaysian Navy).
- Chief Control Electrician Thomas Walters, P/MX 903882.
- Chief Electrician (Air) Harry Wilkinson, L/FX 75944.
- Master at Arms Thomas William Wilkinson, D/MX 833677.
- Chief Ordnance Electrical Artificer (L) Kenneth Edward Young, P/MX 667732.

Army

- 22215258 Staff Sergeant Brian Richard Abethell, Scots Guards.
- 19032655 Warrant Officer Class II (local) Roland Baxter, The King's Own Royal Border Regiment.
- 23545230 Sergeant William Michael Bishop, Royal Army Ordnance Corps.
- 23493086 Staff Sergeant Michael Ralph Blackmore, Royal Regiment of Artillery.
- 24047968 Lance Corporal Joseph Patrick Booth, Corps of Royal Engineers.
- 22215578 Sergeant Alexander Chisholm, Scots Guards.
- 22215329 Sergeant Frederick Colley, Scots Guards.
- 23606286 Staff Sergeant Christopher McGowan Denniston, 51st Highland Volunteers Territorial and Army Volunteer Reserve.
- 21147965 Sergeant Durgabahadur Sahi, 6th Queen Elizabeth's Own Gurkha Rifles.
- 22559424 Staff Sergeant William Michael Fitzsimmons, Royal Army Ordnance Corps.
- 23979024 Corporal John Alfred Frost, The Queen's Regiment.
- 19032288 Warrant Officer Class II (acting) Thomas Gledhill, Royal Regiment of Artillery.
- 22525316 Staff Sergeant David Goldie, Royal Regiment of Artillery.
- 22776291 Staff Sergeant (acting) Peter Learmonth Gray, Royal Corps of Signals.
- 22214060 Sergeant Robert Hall, Coldstream Guards.
- 22781440 Private Neal Hicks, The Staffordshire Regiment (The Prince of Wales's).
- 22289102 Staff Sergeant Robert Andrew Jones, Corps of Royal Electrical and Mechanical Engineers.
- 23210547 Staff Sergeant Roderick John Mathieson, Royal Corps of Signals.
- 22547888 Warrant Officer Class II (acting) John McCormack, Corps of Royal Engineers.
- 23514755 Staff Sergeant Patrick Joseph McQuillan, Corps of Royal Military Police.
- 2549285 Staff Sergeant Dennis North, Royal Corps of Signals.
- 22289310 Staff Sergeant Kenneth Robinson, Corps of Royal Engineers.
- 21152036 Sergeant Rupman Thapa, 7th Duke of Edinburgh's Own Gurkha Rifles.
- 23481257 Corporal Louis Smith, Royal Corps of Signals.
- 23546147 Sergeant Norman Smith, Corps of Royal Military Police.
- 23529855 Sergeant Eric Frederick Sparrow, Royal Army Ordnance Corps.
- 6977225 Staff Sergeant Charles Henry Spendiff, Irish Guards.
- 22246849 Warrant Officer Class II (acting) Edmund Sproule, Corps of Royal Engineers.
- 22244282 Staff Sergeant Nigel Craig Robertson Turnbull, The Parachute Regiment.
- 23487346 Staff Sergeant Robert James Washington, Corps of Royal Electrical and Mechanical Engineers.
- 23534329 Sergeant Roy Worthy, The Queen's Regiment.
- 23325025 Sergeant George Frederick Yeandle, Royal Army Veterinary Corps.

Royal Air Force

- Acting Warrant Officer Robert Findlay (X4066436).
- K1896965 Flight Sergeant Desmond Leslie Broughton.
- T4089084 Flight Sergeant Henry Edward Brown.
- D1921056 Flight Sergeant Brian Edward Chamberlain.
- B0585099 Flight Sergeant Denys Vernon French.
- F4002500 Flight Sergeant Raymond Sidney Martin.
- N0991494 Flight Sergeant James Paton.
- J4007137 Flight Sergeant Michael Francis Potter.
- A4051923 Flight Sergeant John Haydn Price.
- C1853267 Flight Sergeant Francis Joseph Walker.
- B3515343 Flight Sergeant John Dixon Whittaker.
- D4074149 Chief Technician Alwyn Alan Ackroyd.
- G2425211 Chief Technician James Campbell Anderson.
- R0583491 Chief Technician Derek William Bird.
- A1920755 Chief Technician Alexander Nisbet Maule.
- F1219188 Chief Technician Eric Gordon Pinkstone.
- C0577193 Chief Technician William Charles Smith.
- K3504230 Chief Technician William Lawrence Smith.
- R0593041 Chief Technician Christopher Trafford.
- A0680S85 Chief Technician Hamish Howard Walker.
- R1397343 Chief Technician Albert Douglas Wattley.
- C4056245 Sergeant William Brown.
- L407S400 Sergeant Peter John Herrington.
- Y3S16365 Sergeant Peter Geoffrey Holland.
- R4242398 Sergeant Ernest George Jackson.
- U4185802 Sergeant Keith Alfred Kendall.
- R4193706 Sergeant Kenneth Roy Link.
- E4030881 Sergeant Peter Leonard Silvester.
- N4176760 Sergeant Michael Gabriel Sweeney, for services with the Royal Malaysian Air Force.
- A4168175 Acting Sergeant Peter John McGowan.
- G4253375 Acting Sergeant William Edward Rees.
- U4240059 Corporal Walter Miller Love Bruce.
- K4246505 Corporal Aubrey Collingwood.
- B3526758 Corporal Gerald Louis Kemp.

Civil Division

United Kingdom

- Robert Abelwhite, Foreman. For services to the Cathedral at Bury St. Edmunds.
- William Herbert Adams, Carpenter, SS Southern Cross, Shaw Savill & Albion Co. Ltd.
- Albert Aldred, Chargehand Handyman, British Broadcasting Corporation.
- Walter Harry Atkins, Senior Messenger, Ministry of Posts and Telecommunications.
- Frank W. Austen, Head Gardener, Benenden Chest Hospital, Cranbrook, Kent.
- William Ernest Austin, Bus Driver, Swanley Garage, London Country Bus Services Ltd.
- Irene Patricia Avis, Assistant Group Officer, London Fire Brigade.
- Edith Mary Barling, Voluntary Worker, Hull Sea Cadet Corps.
- Charles Ernest Beckett, Electrical Filler, Chesterfield District, East Midlands Electricity Board.
- Thelma Bemrose, Centre Organiser, Whitley Bay, Northumberland, Women's Royal Voluntary Service.
- Ernest Albert Victor Bignell, Foreman Vehicle Tester, Department of the Environment.
- Leonard Bird, Chief Erection and Service Engineer, Clarke Chapman & Co. Ltd.
- Ernest Arthur George Blake, Service Officer, Cardiff Undertaking, Wales Gas Board.
- Charles Henry Bland, Contract Foreman, Wheeler, Crittall Berry Ltd.
- Megan Boyd, Salmon Flytier, Brora, Sutherland.
- Gerald Douglas Bradley, Division/Divisional Chief, Britannia Royal Naval College, Dartmouth.
- Robert Taylor Briggs, Relieving Boatswain, British & Commonwealth Shipping Co. Ltd.
- Charles Gordon Brinkley, Ferryman, Felixstowe, Suffolk.
- Thomas Albert Brooks, lately Chargehand/Installation Inspector, London Electricity Board.
- Mark Brown, National Savings Honorary Industrial Group Collector, Silksworth, Durham.
- Ada Bruce, Sub-Postmistress, Shustoke Green Sub-Office, Coleshill, Birmingham.
- William Bernard Brunskill, Instructional Officer Grade I, Department of Employment.
- Lilian May Burgess, Cleaner, Department for National Savings.
- Robert Burnett, Assistant Commandant, Edinburgh Special Constabulary.
- Frederick Burrows, Chargehand Crane Driver, Weston Point Dock, British Waterways Board.
- Frank Leslie Burton, Group Office Assistant, Royal Ordnance Factory, Nottingham.
- Walter George Childs, Chief Inspector, Birmingham City Police.
- James Clark, General Foreman, Sorrell Ltd., York.
- Kenneth White Clark, Head Ranger, Dunfriesshire, Forestry Commission.
- Joseph Clarke, lately Kiosk Cleaner, Manchester Head Post Office.
- David Close, Janitor, West Linton Primary School, Peeblesshire.
- Josephine Rosamond Cochrane, County Health and Hospital Organiser, Surrey Women's Royal Voluntary Service.
- Norman Cooper, Senior Foreman, Polished Wired-Glass Warehouse, Pilkington Brothers Ltd., Doncaster.
- Cyril Ernest Coote, Custodian and Groundsman, Fenner's, Cambridge University Cricket Club.
- Herbert Cecil Cornish, Grocery Shop Manager, RAF Brampton, Navy, Army and Air Force Institutes.
- Benjamin Cottam, Rotary Machine Minder, HM Stationery Office.
- Doris Coulson, National Savings Honorary Street Group Collector, Guildford.
- Alice Cresswell, Chief Supervisor, Travel Enquiry Office, London Transport Executive.
- William Cudmore, Senior Gardening Instructor, St. Loye's College for the Training and Rehabilitation of the Disabled.
- Thomas Currie, Head Porter, Dumfries and Galloway Royal Infirmary.
- Gordon Dalley, Coastguardsman, Mevagissey.
- Arthur George Dancey, lately Chief Officer, HM Prison Oxford.
- James Herbert Davenport, Craftsman Chargehand, National Gas Turbine Establishment, Pyestock.
- Bnnley Rees Davies, Pithead Baths Superintendent, East Wales Area, Aberaman Colliery, National Coal Board.
- Gertrude M. Davies, Centre Organiser, Winslow Rural District, Buckinghamshire, Women's Royal Voluntary Service.
- Annie Dawson, Machine Shop Supervisor, Decca Radar Ltd., New Maiden, Surrey.
- John Albert Dodd, Station Officer (Part-time), Devon Fire Brigade.
- Esther Edwards, National Savings Honorary Street Group Collector, Bishops Castle, Shropshire.
- James Lawrence Edwardson, Attending Boatman, Muckle Flugga Lighthouse.
- Eileen Eldred, Foster Mother, Down County Welfare Department.
- Charles Henry Evans, Comb Pointer, R. A. Lister & Co. Ltd., Dursley, Gloucestershire.
- Vivian Charles Evans, Sub-Officer (Part-time), Monmouthshire Fire Brigade.
- Thomas Sidney Farmer, Stoker, Drafting Pay and Records Office, Royal Marines, Eastney.
- Doris Foster, lately Cloth Mender, Kelsall and Kemp Ltd., Rochdale.
- Henry James Foster, Driver, Movements Department, Eastern Region, British Railways Board.
- Shipwright Lieutenant Commander Arthur James Franklin, Royal Navy (Retd.), Technical Grade II (Technical Author) HMS Phoenix, Portsmouth.
- Eleanor Frisk, Supervisor Telephones, Macclesfield Telephone Exchange.
- Jean Garden, Divisional President, Midlothian Branch, British Red Cross Society.
- Marjorie Gargett, Senior Member, County Staff (Clothing) Shropshire, Women's Royal Voluntary Service.
- Benjamin Goddard, Pursebearer to the Lord Chancellor.
- George Grafton, lately Toolsmith, Trafford Park Works, British Steel Corporation.
- Lilian Graham, Laundry Manageress, Fanfield Hospital, Hertfordshire.
- Ernest Charles Gray, Improver, Mechanical and Electrical Engineering Department, Southern Region, British Railways Board.
- William Victor Gray, Civilian Driver, Metropolitan Police Office.
- Jean Greenaway, Honorary Collector, School and Street Savings Groups, City of Londonderry.
- George Greenshields, Lorry Driver, James Hemphill Ltd., Glasgow.
- Sidney David Greenwood, Office Keeper, Ministry of Defence.
- Edgar George Gurney, Constable, Metropolitan Police.
- Alice Gwilliam, National Savings Honorary Social Groups Collector, Chirk, Denbighshire.
- Emma, J. Hall, Group Collector, Street Savings Group, Warrenpoint, County Down.
- Frederick Cecil Halliday, Foreman, Seacat Assembly, Short Brothers & Harland Ltd., Belfast.
- William Thomas Harrison, Principal Door-keeper, House of Lords.
- Elizabeth Duncan Hawes, Domestic Superintendent, North Middlesex Hospital.
- William Colin Hawley, Formerly District Foreman, North Riding of Yorkshire County Council.
- Harold Joseph Hayles, Coxswain, Yarmouth Lifeboat, Isle of Wight, Royal National Lifeboat Institution.
- Robert Noel Haylett, Auxiliary Coastguard (Rescue Section), Winterton, Norfolk.
- Leslie Robert Heath, Senior Foreman, Weybridge Division, British Aircraft Corporation Ltd.
- James Dunphy Heslin, Technician 2A, Edinburgh Telephone Area.
- William Thomas Heyward, Horticultural Foreman, Somerset Farm Institute, Cannington.
- Jackie Hills, Commandant, Grangemouth National Dock Labour Board Section, St. Andrew's Ambulance Association.
- Chrissie May Hiscocks, National Savings Honorary Street Group Collector, Bath.
- Ernest William Henry Hobson, lately Chief Beadle, Covent Garden Market, London.
- Gordon William Hodgson, Keeper, Clay Lane Blastfurnaces, Middlesbrough, British Steel Corporation.
- Linda Rosalie Hounsell, Home Help, Basingstoke, Hampshire.
- Alfred George Howe, Lately Civilian Workman, HM Borstal Institution, Feltham.
- Arthur Hughes, Field Officer Grade III, Ministry of Agriculture, Fisheries and Food.
- Herbert Victor Hughes, Sergeant, Bedfordshire and Luton Constabulary.
- Nevil Bennett Hughes, Constable, Metropolitan Police.
- Arthur Edward Humber, Technical Grade III, Rocket Propulsion Establishment, Westcott.
- Harry John William Hunt, Progress Chaser, Royal Aircraft Establishment, Farnborough.
- Eric Hursthouse, Colliery Overman, North Nottinghamshire Area, Sherwood Colliery, National Coal Board.
- Ada Alice Jackson, Sub-Postmistress, Chadlington Post Office, Oxford.
- Dorothy Gladys Winifred Jackson, Voluntary Welfare Worker, Air Training Corps, City of London Wing.
- Alfred Charles Jago, Head Porter, Falmouth and District Hospital.
- Joseph James, Technical Grade II, Ministry of Commerce for Northern Ireland.
- Brian Henry Roger Jolly, Commandant, Lincolnshire Special Constabulary.
- Gomer Jones, Remedial Gymnast, Osborne House, Isle of Wight.
- Henry Jones, Station Officer, (Training), Liverpool Ambulance Service.
- John Tudor Jones, Tractor Driver, North Wales, Forestry Commission.
- Thomas Anthony Keep, Foreign and Commonwealth Office.
- Harry Richard Kemble, Foreign and Commonwealth Office.
- Jack Laughton, Finished Goods Handler, General Foods Ltd., Banbury.
- Charles James Law, Head Foreman Rigger, Swan Hunter Shipbuilders, Wallsend Yard.
- Jack Sydney Lemon, Plumber, SS Iberia, P. & O. Steam Navigation Company.
- George Edworthy Lewis, Formerly Foreman, Solvents Department, Shell Chemicals U.K. Ltd.
- Hugh Livingstone, lately Bus Driver, Highland Omnibuses Ltd.
- Ellen Lloyd, Housemother, Sandbrook House, Home for the Elderly, Merthyr Tydfil.
- Nellie Lomas, National Savings Honorary Street Group Collector, Hyde.
- Anthony Thomas McAllister, Forester, Ministry of Agriculture for Northern Ireland.
- Sheila Margaret Enid MacArthur, Centre Organiser, Bridge of Allan, Stirlingshire, Women's Royal Voluntary Service.
- Joseph Cecil McClelland, Inspector, Royal Ulster Constabulary.
- Garnet McFarlane, Sub-Officer (retained), Perth and Kinross Fire Brigade.
- Adam MacGillivray, Chief Observer, Royal Observer Corps.
- Donald William Mackay, Mate-in-Charge, Falmouth, Board of Customs and Excise.
- Douglas Eric McRobert, Tractor Driver, North Wales, Forestry Commission.
- Henry William Marriott, Estate Surveying Assistant Grade II, Department of Environment.
- Jack Marsh, Driver, Messrs. W. Rainford, Ltd., Liverpool.
- John Mill Marshall, Assistant Foreman of Storehouses, Faslane, Ministry of Defence.
- Finlay Martin, Estate Worker, South Uist, Scottish Office.
- Arthur William Frederick Mason, School Staff Instructor, Brentwood School Combined Cadet Force.
- Leslie Mault, Sergeant, Liverpool and Bootle Constabulary.
- Frank Alfred Mayes, Craftsman I, Charge-hand, Road Research Laboratory.
- Leslie Edward Miles, Civilian Instructor Grade II, Ministry of Defence.
- William Leslie Miller, Inshore Fisherman, Beer, Devon.
- Joseph Mills, Station Officer, West Riding of Yorkshire Fire Brigade.
- Allen Musgrove Moat, Coremaker and Loam Moulder, Croydon Foundry Ltd., Croydon.
- Harry Morris, Roll Turner and Grinder, Trostre Works, British Steel Corporation.
- Armugam Narendran, Store Keeper Grade I, Ministry of Defence.
- Harold Nash, Checkweighman, South Midlands Area, Measham Colliery, National Coal Board.
- John Alfred Negus, Grocery Shop Manager, Marlborough Lines, Aldershot, Navy, Army and Air Force Institutes.
- Arthur Oldacre, Salvage Worker, Doncastei Area, Bullcroft Colliery, National Coal Board.
- John Thomas Openshaw, Caretaker, Waterhouses Secondary Modern School, Lymington, Durham.
- William Hugh Orr, Driver, Northern Ireland Carriers Ltd.
- Maria Pace, Manageress, The Connaught Home, Floriana, Malta.
- Charles H. Parker, Schoolkeeper, Stepney Green Boys School, London.
- Benjamin Parsonage, Officer, Glasgow Humane Society.
- George Parker Pease, General Foreman, McLauchlan (Knottingley) Ltd., Yorkshire.
- Thomas Edward Perkins, Storeman Grade I, Larkhill, Ministry of Defence.
- Henry Philcox, Second Coxswain, Shoreham Harbour lifeboat, Royal National Lifeboat Institution.
- Charles Henry Porter, Bricklayer Grade I, HM Dockyard, Portsmouth.
- Charles Sidney Poston, State Enrolled Nurse, Brynhyfryd Hospital, Montgomeryshire.
- Gordon Preston, Senior Ambulance Officer, Tyrone County Hospital, Omagh.
- Walter Titley Price, Process Foreman, New Metals Division, Titanium Plant, Imperial Metal Industries Ltd., Waunarlwydd, near Swansea.
- James Reid, Section Leader, Aerodrome Fire Service, Inverness.
- Edgar Roy Robins, Experimental Worker Grade II, Ministry of Defence.
- Arthur John Rosewarn, lately Divisional Officer, Taunton Ambulance Division, County of Somerset, St. John Ambulance Association and Brigade.
- Evie Russell, Member, Gloucestershire Branch, British Red Cross Society.
- Stephen Henry Jethro Sandwell, Head Messenger, Greater London Council.
- Leslie Thomas Sawle, Chief Storekeeper, Serjeant at Arms' Stores, House of Commons.
- James Wilfred Schofield, Highway Superintendent, West Riding County Council.
- William Walter Charles Sexton, Valveman, Portsmouth Gas Works, Southern Gas Board.
- Leonard Shayler, Supervisory Foreman, Bedford County Council.
- Frank Sherman, Agricultural Worker, Bedfordshire.
- Eric Arthur Sherwood, Technical Class Grade II, Reactor Group, Winfrith, United Kingdom Atomic Energy Authority.
- Henrietta Mary Shrubsole, For voluntary services to the community in Bridgwater, Somerset.
- Albert Guy Skinner, Foreman Mason's Assistant, British Museum.
- Douglas Smith, Chief Inspector, Lancashire Constabulary.
- Richard Frank Smith, Maintenance Foreman, Ipswich Works, Eastern Gas Board.
- Stanley Caryl Smith, Sergeant, Essex and Southend-on-Sea Joint Constabulary.
- Ronald Snelling, Part-time Postman, Kirdford, Sussex.
- Tom Stanley, Distribution Foreman, Northampton District, East Midlands Gas Board.
- Harry Albert Steele, Sub-Officer (Part-time), Worcester City and County Fire Service.
- John Virtue Stinson, Chief Inspector, Royal Ulster Constabulary.
- James William Stretch, Outdoor Assistant (Permanent Way), Divisional Civil Engineer's Office, Preston, British Railways Board.
- Haydn Stringer, Public House Manager, Carlisle and District State Management Scheme.
- Arthur Edward Dennis Taylor, Senior Messenger, Department of Trade and Industry.
- Violet Terlikowski, Foster-parent, Kingsteignton, Devon.
- Thomas Alfred Waddington, Head Shunter, King George Dock, Hull, British Transport Docks Board.
- Arthur Ambrose Walters, Hot Sawman, Round Oak Steel Works Ltd., Worcestershire.
- Nora Daphne Warder, Stewardess, SS Andes, Furness Withy & Co. Ltd.
- William Frederick Ware, Civilian Instructor, Royal Marine Volunteer Boys' Corps, Portsmouth.
- William Taylor Brenchley Waters, Relieving Boatswain, New Zealand Shipping Company Ltd.
- Arthur Francis Watson, Senior Storekeeper, Equipment Department, British Broadcasting Corporation.
- Albert H. Wells, General Finisher (Bookbinding), Remploy Factory, Stockton.
- Leslie George Wells, lately Machine Hand Special, Royal Radar Establishment.
- Henry White, Auxiliary Constable, Royal Ulster Constabulary.
- John Walker White, General Foreman, Central Overhead Line Gang, North Eastern Region, Central Electricity Generating Board.
- Percy Robert Whiting, Employee of Birds Eye Foods Ltd.
- Mary Whittaker, Cook, "Moorfields", Oldham County Borough Home for the Elderly, Lancashire.
- Edna Mary Williams, Hand Sewer, Grafton-Harvey Ltd., Bury St. Edmunds.
- Ellis Williams, Head Porter, St. David's Hospital, Bangor.
- James William Williams, Caretaker, Pilgrim Street County Primary School, Birkenhead, Cheshire.
- Olive Williams, National Savings Honorary Industrial Group Collector, Basildon.
- Jean Margaret Helen Williamson, Draughtswoman, Ministry of Agriculture, Fisheries and Food.
- Henry Wills, Assistant Yard Foreman, National Freight Corporation, London.
- Robert Edmonds Woods, Constable, City of London Police.
- Marion Wrigley, Senior Charge Hand, HM Stationery Office.
- Yee, Chin Yew, lately Clerk Special, Department of the Environment.

Overseas Territories

- Jorge Raimundo Awe, lately District Telephone Operator, Cayo District, British Honduras.
- Tertms Gwangi Babalu, lately Chief Warder, Prisons Department, British Solomon Islands Protectorate.
- Rugby Percival Balderamos, Superintendent, Belize Fire Brigade, British Honduras.
- Lina Chain, Acting Senior Linen Room Supervisor, Medical and Health Department, Hong Kong.
- Winifred Agatha Edwards, Public Health Nurse, Montserrat.
- Alexander Burnett Hadden. For services to the community in the Falkland Islands.
- Anthony Parody. For services to athletics in Gibraltar.
- Francis Mindoo Phillip. For services to cricket in Saint Lucia.
- Ilma Crystallia Varlack, Assistant Teacher Grade 2, British Virgin Islands.
- James Warner. For public services in Nevis.

State of New South Wales

- Henry George Box. For services to migrants in Woollongong.
- John Robert Bredin. For services as honorary Civil Defence Controller for the Shire of Coolamon.
- Judith Cassell. For services to conservation.
- Mervan Leslie Donnelly. For services to local government in Ryde.
- Herbert George Greenaway, lately Shire Clerk, Copmanhurst Shire Council.
- Norman Laurence Griffiths, lately Town Clerk, Ku-ring-gai Municipal Council.
- Laurie Bernadette Henry. For services to the community in Singleton.
- Rawdon Henry McKinnon, lately Senior Inspector of Explosives, Department of Mines.
- Freda Mott. For services to the community in Armidale.
- Walter Martin Newington. For services to ex-Servicemen.
- Denis Washington Smith. For services to the community particularly in the Riverina.
- Elizabeth Marian Walker, lately Senior Clerk, Wellington Shire Council.

State of Victoria

- Vera Mary Austin, Associate and Private Secretary to the Chief Justice.
- John Thomas Campbell, Station Officer, Victorian Civil Ambulance Service.
- Ambrose William Gibson, Station Officer, Victorian Civil Ambulance Service.
- Jack Leo George Lovick. For public services and services to the community in Merrijig.
- Vincent Joseph O'Donnell, lately Messenger, Chief Secretary's Department.
- Frederick Charles Russell. For services to ex-Servicemen.
- Robert Percival Tynan, Engineer, Department of the Legislative Council.
- Thomas James Frederick Ward. For services to the Corps of Commissionaires.

State of Western Australia

- Iris Eleanor Anderson. For meritorious services in the preservation of fauna in Western Australia.
- Theodore John Kannis, JP. For services to the community in Perth, especially to the welfare of pensioners.
- Gladys Winifred May Rolfe. For services to the welfare of ex-Servicemen and Women.
- Minnie Emily Irene Saggers. For services to the community in the district of Tambellup.
- Reginald Taylor. For outstanding services to the conservation of wildlife.

=== Royal Red Cross (RRC) ===
- Ruth Carter, ARRC, Principal Matron, Queen Alexandra's Royal Naval Nursing Service.
- Major Florence Kate Slack (406563), Queen Alexandra's Royal Army Nursing Corps.
- Group Officer Barbara Mary Ducat-Amos, Princess Mary's Royal Air Force Nursing Service.

==== Associate of the Royal Red Cross (ARRC) ====
- Hilda Elizabeth Kathleen Gander, Superintending Sister, Queen Alexandra's Royal Naval Nursing Service.
- Major Margaret Beatrice Burroughs (384982), Queen Alexandra's Royal Army Nursing Corps.
- Major Margaret Mary Heaney (297793), Queen Alexandra's Royal Army Nursing Corps.

=== Air Force Cross (AFC) ===
Royal Navy

- Commander Frederick Hefford, DSC.
- Lieutenant Commander Richard Hardy Burn.

Army Air Corps

- Captain Geoffrey Ross Mallock (469055), Army Air Corps.

Royal Air Force

- Wing Commander James Donald Spottiswood (3511970).
- Wing Commander Peter George Cole Wilson (4043019).
- Squadron Leader Richard Cloke (607869).
- Squadron Leader Peter Dodworth (2617263).
- Squadron Leader Richard Kidney (607671).
- Squadron Leader Lionel Thorner Reid (55077).
- Flight Lieutenant Ian Charles Hamilton Dick (608203).
- Flight Lieutenant Leslie Elgey (4129115).
- Flight Lieutenant John William Arnold Elias (4037885).
- Flight Lieutenant Bruce Anthony Donald McKenzie McDonald (4036925).
- Flight Lieutenant Gordon Clayton Peck (1087542).
- Flight Lieutenant Douglas Arthur Smith (2533386).
- Flight Lieutenant William Harry Tucker (199728).

==== Bar to Air Force Cross ====
- Wing Commander George Philip Black, OBE, AFC, (3130226), Royal Air Force.

=== Queen's Commendation for Valuable Service in the Air ===
Army Air Corps

- Captain Ian Chalmers Scott (478400).

Royal Air Force

- Wing Commander Kenneth Alfred Hutchings (180378).
- Squadron Leader John Michael Alcock (4147998).
- Squadron Leader Ernest Durham (3517536).
- Squadron Leader Peter Henley (2682318).
- Squadron Leader William James Alexander Innes (2600371).
- Squadron Leader William Peter Jago (607741).
- Squadron Leader Peter Cecil Allen Major (2209186).
- Squadron Leader Donald Christopher Read (2765825).
- Flight Lieutenant Alan John Brooks (3510316).
- Flight Lieutenant Roy John Davey (4087077).
- Flight Lieutenant Richard Brian Duckett (608234).
- Flight Lieutenant Nicholas John Galpin (3511409).
- Flight Lieutenant James Ernest Hainsworth (1675324).
- Flight Lieutenant Frank Hayward (578860).
- Flight Lieutenant John Anthony Gerard May (2618867).
- Flight Lieutenant Brian Paul Nicolle (608145).
- Flight Lieutenant Michael Bryan Proudfoot (684716).
- Flight Lieutenant Walter Pearce Sheppard (4043401).
- Flight Lieutenant Kenneth George Sneller, AFC, (1330764).
- Flight Lieutenant Michael David Timbers (4230593).
- Flight Lieutenant Delwyn Williams (4070465).
- Flight Lieutenant David Crighton Young (2620402).
- Master Navigator Kenneth Mellor (B1620089).
- Master Engineer Michael John Cawsey (Q3 507483).
- Master Engineer Alexander Primrose Fraser (W1822311).
- Master Engineer George John Walker Jack (C1597048).
- Master Engineer Felix Donald Smith (K1867846).
- Master Air Loadmaster Albert Clifford Coles (T3080355).

United Kingdom

- Guy Scottie Giannotti, Engineer Officer Instructor, British Overseas Airways Corporation.
- Harry Raymond Nicholls, Flight Superintendent, British Overseas Airways Corporation.
- James Holt Phillips, Test Pilot, Hawker Siddeley Aviation Ltd., Hatfield, Herts.
- Gerald John Smallridge, Chief Flight Test Engineer, Westland Helicopters Ltd., Yeovil, Somerset.
- George Henry Tucker, Chief Steward, British European Airways.
- Leslie Morris Whittington, AFC, Test Pilot, Hawker Siddeley Aviation Ltd., Dunsfold Aerodrome, Godalming, Surrey.

=== Queen's Police Medal (QPM) ===
England and Wales

- Ronald Gregory, Chief Constable, West Yorkshire Constabulary.
- Raymond Naylor Buxton, BEM, Chief Constable, Hertfordshire Constabulary.
- Eric Haslam, Deputy Chief Constable, Kent County Constabulary.
- Arthur Charles Joe Tanswell, Deputy Chief Constable, Wiltshire Constabulary.
- Robert Paul Boyes, Deputy Chief Constable, Mid-Anglia Constabulary.
- James Henry Thompson, Deputy Chief Constable, Sussex Constabulary.
- Alexander Allan Rennie, Assistant Chief Constable, West Mercia Constabulary.
- John Basil Smith, Commander, Metropolitan Police.
- Evan Leslie Williams, Commander, Metropolitan Police.
- Bruce Dix, Commander, Metropolitan Police.
- John Babb, Chief Superintendent, Birmingham City Police.
- Harvey Davenport Birch, Chief Superintendent, West Midlands Constabulary.
- Joseph Mounsey, BEM, Chief Superintendent, Lancashire Constabulary.
- George Clarkson, Chief Superintendent, Metropolitan Police.
- Lewis Minshall, Superintendent, Essex and Southend-on-Sea Joint Constabulary.

Scotland

- Thomas Sorley, Deputy Chief Constable, Inverness Constabulary.
- Hugh Donald George Fraser, Chief Superintendent, Edinburgh City Police — seconded as Deputy Commandant, Scottish Police College.

Northern Ireland

- Samuel Moffat Hamilton, Inspector, Royal Ulster Constabulary.

State of Victoria

- Noel Wilby, MVO, Chief Commissioner of Police, Victoria Police Force.
- Ronald Mayne Braybrook, Assistant Commissioner, Victoria Police Force.
- Gerald Joseph Hickey, Superintendent, Grade I, Victoria Police Force.
- Alfred William John Simmons, Superintendent, Grade I, Victoria Police Force.
- George Herbert Stanesby, Inspector, Grade I, Victoria Police Force.
- Sinclair Imne Miller, Sergeant, Victoria Police Force.

State of Queensland

- Vallis Moore Barlow, Inspector, Queensland Police Force.

State of South Australia

- Raymond Elmo Killmier, Inspector, 2nd Class, South Australian Police Force.
- Colin Edwin Lehmann, Inspector, 2nd Class, South Australian Police Force.
- Ronald Layton Archibald, Inspector, 2nd Class, South Australian Police Force.
- William Richard Jeffree, Inspector, 1st Class, South Australian Police Force.

State of Tasmania

- Henry Thomas Reid, Superintendent, Tasmania Police Force.
- Leonard Herbert Walter Rothwell, Superintendent, Tasmania Police Force.

Overseas Territories

- Mervin Leon Barrow, Chief of Police, Royal Antigua Police Force.
- Albert Joel Miller, MBE, Deputy Commissioner, Royal Bahamas Police Force.
- Alexander Grainger Rose, Assistant Commissioner, Royal Hong Kong Police Force.
- Salathiel Harvey Thompson, Deputy Commissioner, Royal Bahamas Police Force.
- Oliver Salisbury Winfield Trott, Chief Superintendent, Bermuda Police Force.

=== Queen's Fire Services Medal (QFSM) ===
England and Wales

- Thomas Clark, Divisional Officer, Grade I (Deputy Chief Officer), Dorset Fire Brigade.
- William Robert Wilson Golding, Chief Officer, Darlington Fire Brigade.
- Joseph Dominic Farren, Deputy Assistant Chief Officer, London Fire Brigade.
- Frederick Reuben Hall, MBE, Chief Officer, Barnsley Fire Brigade.
- Robert Lennie Pearson, BEM, Chief Officer, Norfolk Fire Brigade.

=== Colonial Police Medal (CPM) ===
- John Geoffrey Appleby, Assistant Superintendent, Saint Helena Constabulary (Ascension).
- Au Kim-wah, Senior Inspector, Royal Hong Kong Police Force.
- Okell Cornell Cartwright, Inspector, Royal Bahamas Police Force.
- William Chan Kang-po, Superintendent, Royal Hong Kong Auxiliary Police Force.
- Cheung Shu-chun, Principal Fireman, Hong Kong Fire Services.
- Cecil Basil Davis, Assistant Superintendent, Royal Antigua Police Force.
- Donald Kerr Devereux, Assistant Superintendent, Gilbert and Ellice Islands Constabulary.
- Hildreth Lorden Doctrove, Deputy Chief of Police, Royal Dominica Police Force.
- Thomas David Doyle, Inspector, Bermuda Police Force.
- Collet Fitzgerald Gill, BEM, Assistant Superintendent (Acting Superintendent), British Honduras Police Force.
- Louis James Hemmings, Deputy Superintendent, Royal Bahamas Police Force.
- Ernest Percival Max Hunt, Superintendent, Royal Hong Kong Police Force.
- Peter Jackson, Superintendent, Royal Hong Kong Police Force.
- Kong Fung-chuk, Superintendent, Royal Hong Kong Police Force.
- Lau Ping-wah, Principal Fireman, Hong Kong Fire Services.
- Lo Ying-wu, Senior Inspector, Royal Hong Kong Auxiliary Police Force.
- Ng Chung, Senior Fireman, Hong Kong Fire Services.
- Ng Ting, Principal Fireman, Hong Kong Fire Services.
- Walter John Palmer, Chief Inspector, Royal Hong Kong Police Force.
- Damase Henry Philbert, Chief of Police, Royal Dominica Police Force.
- Andrew Siu Tham-guan, Inspector, Royal Hong Kong Auxiliary Police Force.
- Howard Thomas George Smith, Inspector, Royal Bahamas Police Force.
- Tam Sun-tai, Sergeant, Royal Hong Kong Police Force.
- Whitmore Augustus Turnquest, Sergeant, Royal Bahamas Police Force.
- Leonard Worrallo, Senior Divisional Officer, Hong Kong Fire Services.

== Australia ==
=== Knight Bachelor ===
- Cyrus Lenox Simson Hewitt, OBE, Secretary, Prime Minister's Department. For distinguished public service.
- John Peter Daniel Lloyd, of Sandy Bay, Tasmania. For distinguished services to finance, commerce and government.
- Ackland Archibald Lord, OBE, of Toorak, Victoria. For distinguished services to the community in Victoria and Tasmania.
- Brigadier John Ernest Pagan, CMG, MBE, ED, Agent-General for New South Wales in London. For distinguished political and public service.

=== Order of the Bath ===
==== Companion of the Order of the Bath (CB) ====
Military Division

- Vice-Admiral Richard Innes Peek, OBE, DSC, Royal Australian Navy, Chief of Naval Staff.

=== Order of Saint Michael and Saint George ===
==== Knight Grand Cross of the Order of St Michael and St George (GCMG) ====
- The Right Honourable John McEwen, CH, MP. For eminent political and public services to Australia.

==== Companion of the Order of St Michael and St George (CMG) ====
- Clifford Stuart Christian, of Forrest, Australian Capital Territory. For public service.
- John Qualtrough Ewens, CBE, of Forrest, Australian Capital Territory. For public service.
- William Matheson Morgan, of Toorak, Victoria. For services to the mining industry.

=== Order of the British Empire ===
==== Dame Commander of the Order of the British Empire (DBE) ====
Civil Division

- Kate Isabel Campbell, CBE, MD, FRCOG, of East Kew, Victoria. For her distinguished contribution to the welfare of Australian children.

==== Knight Commander of the Order of the British Empire (KBE) ====
Military Division

- Air Marshal Colin Thomas Hannah, CB, CBE, Royal Australian Air Force, Chief of Air Staff.

Civil Division

- John Wallace Dunlop, of Darling Point, New South Wales. For distinguished services to industry.
- The Honourable Alan Shallcross Hulme, MP, Postmaster-General. For long and distinguished political and public services.
- Sir Douglas Frank Hewson Packer, CBE, of Bellevue Hill, New South Wales. For distinguished services to Australian and International yachting.

==== Commander of the Order of the British Empire (CBE) ====
Military Division

- Rear Admiral David Charles Wells, Royal Australian Navy, Deputy Chief of the Naval Staff.
- Brigadier George Frederick Thomas Richardson, Australian Staff Corps.
- Air Commodore Deryck William Kingwell, DSO, (0346), Royal Australian Air Force.

Civil Division

- Keith McRae Archer, OBE, Commonwealth Statistician, 1962–70.
- Alan Thomas Carmody, OBE, Comptroller-General of Customs and Excise, Canberra.
- Edward Stuart Reginald Hughes, MD, MS, of East Melbourne, Victoria. For services to Medicine and International Relations.
- Talbot Sydney Duckmanton, General Manager, Australian Broadcasting Commission.
- Professor Dorothy Hill, of St. Lucia, Queensland. For services to Geology and Palaeontology.
- Toua Kapena, Ministerial member for Labour and President, Hanuabada Council, Territory of Papua and New Guinea.
- John Neil McCallum, of Bayview, New South Wales. For services to the Performing Arts.
- Professor Victor Martin Trikojus, of Kew, Victoria. For services to science and to government.
- Winifred Mary West, MBE, of Mittagong, New South Wales. For services to education over the past fifty years.

==== Officer of the Order of the British Empire (OBE) ====
Military Division

Royal Australian Navy

- Captain Ian Kitchener Purvis.
- Captain Alan Antony Willis.

Australian Military Forces

- Colonel Gordon Bertrand Combes (399), Australian Staff Corps.
- Lieutenant-Colonel Kevin Ross Murray, ED, (279192), Royal Australian Infantry Corps.
- Colonel Cameron Percy West (2119), Royal Australian Infantry Corps.

Royal Australian Air Force

- Group Captain Frederick Alfred Cousins (022149).
- Wing Commander George Turnbull Dick (01111).
- Group Captain (now Air Commodore) Alwyn Lawrence Greenaway, DFC, (024328), (Retired).

Civil Division

- Raymond Cottam Allsop, of Roseville, New South Wales. For services to the development of Radio.
- Clifford Werlin Andersen, of East Kew, Victoria. For services to the accounting profession.
- Reginald Ernest Battarbee, of Alice Springs, Northern Territory. For services to art and to Aborigines.
- Albert Arthur Langston Brentwood, Assistant Secretary (Industrial Services), Department of Labour and National Service, Melbourne.
- Kenneth Charles Clarke, MC, of Tokyo, Japan. For services to the wool industry.
- Charles Duguid, MB, FRCS, of Kent Town, South Australia. For services to the welfare of Aborigines.
- William George Freeman, of Edgeroi, New South Wales. For services to the wheat industry.
- William Hartley, Special Assistant to Interim Council, proposed Institute of Marine Science.
- Commissioner John Patrick Horan, Commonwealth Arbitration Commissioner.
- Jack Herbert Horn, of South Yarra, Victoria. For services to the automotive industry.
- George Logie-Smith, MBE, of Hawthorn East, Victoria. For services to music.
- Donald Campbell Lucas, Deputy President, Sydney Branch, Surf Life Saving Association.
- Andrew Leslie Moore, Parliamentary Librarian, Canberra.
- Percy Pearson, JP, of Nedlands, Western Australia. For services to ex-servicemen and women.
- Russell George Piggott, of Sandy Bay, Tasmasnia. For services to ex-servicemen and women.
- Councillor Wilfred Metcalfe Randall, of Norfolk Island. For services to the community.
- Archdeacon Byam William Roberts, of Port Moresby, Territory of Papua and New Guinea. For services to education.
- Joyce Crosson Rodmell, FCNA, of Sydney, New South Wales. For services to nursing.
- John Edmund Ryan, Minister, Australian Embassy, Washington.
- Roy Frederick Rhodes Scragg, MD, BS, of Port Moresby, Territory of Papua and New Guinea. For public service.
- Laurence Elwyn Short, of Sydney, New South Wales. For services to the industrial relations.
- James Leishman Skerrett, First Assistant Director General (Telecommunications), Central Staff, Postmaster-General's Department, Melbourne.
- Denis Ashton Warner, of Mount Eliza, Victoria. For services to journalism.
- Reverend Zurewe Kamong Zurenuo, of Lae, Morabe District, Territory of Papua and New Guinea. For services to the community.

==== Member of the Order of the British Empire (MBE) ====
Military Division

Royal Australian Navy

- Lieutenant Commander Edward Leslie Nichols, VRD, Royal Australian Naval Volunteer Reserve.
- Lieutenant John Edgar Scott.

Australian Military Forces

- Major Jack Alexander William Ewart (2229), Royal Australian Artillery Corps.
- Warrant Officer Class 2 Maxwell Leslie Falconer (2104486), Royal Australian Artillery.
- Warrant Officer Class 2 Harry Vardon John Hutton (21688), Royal Australian Corps of Signals.
- Captain Ronald Buchanan Johnston (214179), Royal Australian Engineers.
- Warrant Officer Class 2 John McCracken (372967), Royal Australian Engineers.
- Major John Ladner Martin (179), Royal Australian Artillery Corps.
- Major John Frederick Miller (27234), Australian Staff Corps.
- Warrant Officer Class 2 (Temporary Warrant Officer Class 1) Tiuamoa-Lewaraka (8545), Royal Australian Infantry Corps.
- Major Stanley George Tomkins (2905049), Royal Australian Corps of Signals.
- Major Edward Alexander Withington (3334), Royal Australian Infantry Corps.

Royal Australian Air Force

- Squadron Leader Alexander Fraser Carrey (03191).
- Warrant Officer Blair Francis Jackson (A3 2178).
- Squadron Leader (now Wing Commander) Elton Gordon Pollard (0612), (Retired).
- Warrant Officer David Rands (A216532).
- Flight Lieutenant George Albert Bradbury Waldron Reynolds (035553).

Civil Division

- Charles Rudolfe Anderson, Supervising Engineer, Postmaster General's Department, Queensland.
- Alice Kathleen Lorraine Brennan, Matron Grade 4, Darwin Hospital, Northern Territory.
- Arthur John Burgess, of Caulfield, Victoria. For services to the textile industry.
- Patrick Joseph Cosgriff, Senior Assistant Director (Benefits), Department of Social Services, Victoria.
- Robert Alexander Coutts, of Balwyn, Victoria. For services to the shipping industry.
- Evelyn Vera Cowell, Matron Grade 1, Repatriation General Hospital, Concord, New South Wales.
- Elizabeth Mildred Crouch. For services to the community in Papua, New Guinea.
- Edward Francis Shadrick D'Ambrosio, of Darwin, Northern Territory. For services to the community.
- Leonard Adolphe Deleuil, formerly Flight Service Supervisor, Department of Civil Aviation, Perth.
- Edward Maxwell Diment, MB, BS, of Corrimal, New South Wales. For services to the community.
- John Leslie Emanuel, JP, Assistant Secretary, War Services Homes Branch, Department of Housing, Canberra.
- The Reverend Thomas James Fleming, of Yuendumu Native Settlement, Northern Territory. For services to the Aboriginal community.
- Nancy Giese, of Darwin, Northern Territory. For services to the community.
- John William Goffage (Chips Rafferty), of Vaucluse, New South Wales. For services to the performing arts.
- Robert Harris, of Ashfield, New South Wales. For services to dentistry.
- Tom Derrick Harris, of Darwin, Northern Territory. For services to the community.
- Stanley Wilfred Hayes, of Brighton, Victoria. For services to the pharmaceutical profession.
- Reverend Brother John Dominic Healy, of Waverley, New South Wales. For services to education.
- Ethel Sophy Helyar, of Hungerford, Queensland. For services to the community.
- Thomas Ambrose Herbert, of Northbridge, New South Wales. For services to industrial relations and the meat industry.
- Brian John Holloway, QPM, Deputy Commissioner, Royal Papua and New Guinea Constabulary.
- Robert Victor Hutchinson, Director, Sub-Treasury, Sydney.
- Donald William Isles, of Griffith, New South Wales. For services to the community.
- Pamela Kilborn, of Reservoir, Victoria. For services in sporting and international spheres.
- Ralph Henry Laby, Senior Research Scientist, Commonwealth Scientific and Industrial Research Organisation, Division of Animal Physiology.
- Myrrha Olive Llewellyn, of Canberra. For services to the community, especially youth.
- Cheryl Ann Loydstrom, of Moggill, Queensland. For achievements at the Commonwealth Paraplegic Games in Edinburgh.
- Arnold Walter McKibbin, of Turramurra, New South Wales. For services to the RAAF School at Penang, Malaya.
- John Bryan Mathieson, MB, BS, Commonwealth Director of Health, Western Australia.
- Margery Grace Newman Morris, Director, Finance Industries, Trade and Development Group, Parliamentary Library, Canberra.
- David Lawrence O'Connor, First Assistant Comptroller-General (Tariff), Department of Customs and Excise, Canberra.
- Alderman Edmund Joseph O'Connor, of Yass, New South Wales. For services to local government.
- Archelaus James Opie, MB, FRACS, of Lismore, New South Wales. For services to the community.
- Clive James Price, First Assistant Commissioner (Engineering), National Capital Development Commission, Canberra.
- Richard John Prowse, Chief Film Censor.
- Joyce May Riley, of Turner, Australian Capital Territory. For services to disabled children.
- Favel Thomas Satterthwaite, of Narrandera, New South Wales. For services to the community.
- Fred Shaw Mayer, of Baiyer River, Western Highlands District, Territory of Papua and New Guinea. For services to aviculture.
- Pita Simogun, BEM, of West New Britain, Territory of Papua and New Guinea. For services to the community.
- Arthur Edward Smith, of Willoughby, New South Wales. For services to music.
- John William Stokes, of Macquarie, Australian Capital Territory. For public service.
- Tataing-Nabir, Deputy Land Titles Commissioner, Morobe District, Territory of Papua and New Guinea.
- Cynthea Mary Teague, Assistant Director-General, Head Office, Department of Works.
- Ernest Charles Thomas, Superintendent, Personnel Branch, Postmaster-General's Department, South Australia.
- John Lavars Trevenen, ED, of Ballarat, Victoria. For services to the automobile industry.
- George Joseph White, of Chermside, Queensland. For services to music.

=== Companion of the Imperial Service Order (ISO) ===
- Kenneth Stuart McIntosh, Director of Veterinary Hygiene, Department of Health, Canberra.
- Francis John Malone, Manager, Ordnance Factory, Maribyrnong
- Henry Copeland Menzies, former Australian Trade Commissioner, The Hague.

=== British Empire Medal (BEM) ===
Military Division

Royal Australian Navy

- Sergeant 1st Class Walter George Catt, Royal Australian Naval Dockyard Police.
- Chief Petty Officer Stanley Thomas Crisp (R47681).
- Engineroom Artificer Kenneth William Matters (R66438).
- Radio Operator John Sehi (PNG 80317).
- Chief Engineering Mechanic Bevis Gabriel Harrison Zemek (R32807).

Australian Military Forces

- Staff Sergeant (Temporary Warrant Officer Class 2) Donald Gordon Aitken (22842), Royal Australian Engineers.
- Staff Sergeant (Temporary Warrant Officer Class 2) Jack Alexander Butcher (21904), Royal Australian Infantry Corps.
- Sergeant (Temporary Warrant Officer Class 2) John Henry Downie (252500), Australian Army Catering Corps.
- Sergeant James Alexander Eraser (15145), Royal Australian Engineers.
- Sergeant Wayne Albert Andrew Hobbs (37843), Royal Australian Engineers.
- Signalman (Temporary Corporal) Robert Stephen Newton (34005), Royal Australian Corps of Signals.
- Sergeant Albert Stephen Reeves (245804), Royal Australian Army Medical Corps.
- Sergeant William Charles Swain (110427), Royal Australian Army Medical Corps.

Royal Australian Air Force

- Sergeant David John Brumfield (A221339).
- Flight Sergeant Reginald Arthur Robert Christie (A25858).
- Flight Sergeant Robert Keith Davidson (Al 12044).
- Flight Sergeant Charles William Hoff (A 12852).

Civil Division

- Jessie Florence Ashton, of Reid, Australian Capital Territory. For services to the community.
- Harry Baker, Postmaster, Brisbane General Post Office.
- Dolf Brenner, formerly Clerk, Passports Section, Department of Immigration, Melbourne.
- Annie Broadfoot, of Wallsend, New South Wales. For services to the community.
- Walter Brown, lately Senior Nurse (Male), Repatriation General Hospital, Heidelberg, Victoria.
- Henry John Burke, JP, of Ballarat, Victoria. For services to the community.
- Robert Stephen Butler, Postmaster, Townsville, Queensland.
- Robert Paisley Cooper, Senior Inspecting Officer, Army Inspection Service.
- Vera Florence Dunne, Postmistress, Wollondilly Post Office, New South Wales.
- Thomas George Bartlett Easton, formerly Biochemist, Commonwealth Health Laboratories, Hobart, Tasmania.
- George Ashcroft Edwards, of Finley, New South Wales. For services to the community.
- Maurice Norbourne Fitzgerald, JP, formerly Postmaster, Newcastle, New South Wales.
- Charles Henry Flavel, of Broken Hill, New South Wales. For services to the community.
- Lorenzo Gauci, of Broken Hill, New South Wales. For services to the community.
- Henry James Gaylard, of Ainslie, Australian Capital Territory. For services to the community, especially youth.
- Kenneth Eric Wallace Grant, of Hunters Hill, New South Wales. For services to the welfare of RAN personnel.
- Nancy Grant, of Rose Bay, New South Wales. For services to the community.
- Henry Eric Hancock, formerly Postmaster, Broken Hill, New South Wales.
- John Wells Harland, Clerk, Finance and Accounting Branch, Postmaster-General's Department, Victoria.
- Gordon William Hastie, JP, of Mosman, New South Wales. For services to ex-servicemen and women.
- Mary Hayes, of Tweed Heads, New South Wales. For services to the community.
- Edith Hearle, of Woodfield, Victoria. For services to the community.
- George Alan Henry, formerly Barracks Officer, Department of Defence, Melbourne, Victoria.
- George Albert Higgins, Clerk, Naval Pay Section, Australia House, London.
- Ronald Wilson Hille, Technical Officer, Repatriation General Hospital, Daw Park, South Australia.
- Keith Errol Hogan, of Muswellbrook, New South Wales. For services to the community.
- Edna Mary Hopkins, Clerk, Department of Health, Perth, Western Australia.
- Ivy Frances May Jones, of Oatley, New South Wales. For services to the community.
- Kora Kabua, Supreme Court Interpreter, Port Moresby, Territory of Papua and New Guinea.
- Desmond Michael Kelly, Orderly, Alice Springs Hospital, Northern Territory.
- George Laing, formerly Senior Postal Officer, Mail Exchange Branch, Postmaster-General's Department, New South Wales.
- Janet Elizabeth Limn, of Katoomba, New South Wales. For services to the community.
- Pukari Lakoko, Hospital Assistant, Kukipi Hospital, Gulf District, Territory of Papua and New Guinea.
- Alan James Duncan McClure, Clerk, Naval Secretariat, Department of the Navy, Melbourne, Victoria.
- Laurence Thomas Maloney, JP, of Uralla, New South Wales. For services to the community.
- Pamela Angela Marshall, Assistant Private Secretary to the Prime Minister.
- Norman Owen Martin, of Leichhardt, New South Wales. For services to the community.
- Mary Constance Mason, of Rose Bay, New South Wales. For services to the community.
- Arthur Horace Lionel Milford, of Geraldton, Western Australia. For services to ex-servicemen and women.
- Emily Nettleton, of Mascot, New South Wales. For services to the community.
- Victor Hugh Parkinson, Registrar, Australian School of Pacific Administration, Sydney, New South Wales.
- Winifred Gertrude Rice, of Turner, Australian Capital Territory. For services to the community.
- Margaret Alice Ring, of Billinudgel, New South Wales. For services to the community.
- Dzidra Riverans, Designer and Senior Embroider, Commonwealth Government Clothing factory, Melbourne, Victoria.
- John Leslie Roney, Senior Orderly, Katherine Hospital, Northern Territory.
- Kenneth Raymond Scarlett, formerly Mains Superintendent, Australian Capital Territory Electricity Authority.
- Emily Smith, Postmistress, Bindawalla, New South Wales.
- Mange Sopa, Sergeant Second Class, Royal Papua and New Guinea Constabulary.
- Jean Elma Stewart, Senior Occupational Therapist, Repatriation General Hospital, Heidelberg, Victoria.
- Edith Catherine Taylor, Postmistress, Yarras, New South Wales.
- Rita Mary Vaughton, Laundress, Darwin Hospital, Northern Territory.
- Daniel Robert Weeks, formerly Postmaster, Bega, New South Wales.
- John Charles Wilks, Mail Contractor, Meningie-Tailem Bend, South Australia.
- Percy Theodore Witts, JP, formerly Postmaster, Eastwood, New South Wales.
- Jane Wright, Prime Minister's Lodge, Canberra.

=== Royal Red Cross (RRC) ===
- Matron Maude Agnes Joyce Jones, ARRC, QHNS, Royal Australian Naval Nursing Service.

==== Associate of the Royal Red Cross (ARRC) ====
- Lieutenant (Temporary Captain) Lorraine Kaye Potts, Royal Australian Army Nursing Corps.

=== Air Force Cross (AFC) ===
Royal Australian Air Force

- Flight Lieutenant Robert Ayrton May (04441).
- Flight Lieutenant Carl Peter Ring (0315389).
- Flight Lieutenant William Edward Scott (0219569).

=== Queen's Fire Services Medal (QFSM) ===
- Frederick Charles Townsend, Regional Fire Officer, Port Moresby.

=== Queen's Commendation for Valuable Service in the Air ===
Royal Australian Air Force

- Flight Lieutenant Kevin John Bricknell, (0314790).
- Flight Lieutenant Peter Huddart De Rouffignac (053745).
- Squadron Leader Maxwell Anthony Loves (014398).
- Squadron Leader Kenneth George Smith (0218330).

== Sierra Leone ==
=== Order of Saint Michael and Saint George ===
==== Companion of the Order of St Michael and St George (CMG) ====
- Silvanus Bamidele Nicol-Cole, Governor, Bank of Sierra Leone.

=== Order of the British Empire ===
==== Knight Commander of the Order of the British Empire (KBE) ====
Civil Division

- Ernest Dunstan Morgan, OBE, JP. For outstanding public service.

==== Commander of the Order of the British Empire (CBE) ====
Civil Division

- The Honourable Mr. Justice Jeremiah Bankole Marcus-Jones, Justice of the Court of Appeal.

==== Officer of the Order of the British Empire (OBE) ====
Military Division

- Lieutenant-Colonel Roderick Jacob Beresford-Cole, Royal Sierra Leone Military Forces.
- Lieutenant-Colonel Joseph Saidu Momoh, Royal Sierra Leone Military Forces.

Civil Division

- Jacob Galba-Bright, JP. For valuable public service.
- The Reverend Dr. Benjamin Albert Carew. For outstanding services to the teaching profession.
- Rudolf John Dworzak. For services to sport.
- The Reverend Isaac Sylvanus Taiwo Christian Fewry. For outstanding services to the teaching profession.
- Alhaji Mohammed Babba Kebbay. For loyal and devoted service to the Muslim community in Sierra Leone.

==== Member of the Order of the British Empire (MBE) ====
Military Division

- Regimental Sergeant-Major, Warrant Officer Class 1 Ansumana Bockarie Tarawallie, Royal Sierra Leone Military Forces.

Civil Division

- Alfa Saad Adams, JP. For long and outstanding service to the Muslim community in Sierra Leone.
- Walter Omagbemi Carew, lately Deputy Accountant-General.
- Nathaniel Bainbridge Olufemi Gray. For services to the teaching profession.
- Tigidangie Foday Kabba. For services to agriculture.
- Paramount Chief Balla Kalie Koroma II, Paramount Chief, Yiffin, Nieni Chiefdom, Komadugu District, Northern Province.
- Paramount Chief Samuel Alexandra Kpange, JP, Paramount Chief, Fakunya Chiefdom, Moyamba District, Southern Province.
- Patrick Robert Petit, Principal Inspector of Produce.
- Josephine Latilewa Rogerson. For services to the nursing profession.
- Paramount Chief Kandeh Saio III, Paramount Chief, Pendembu Gorahun Chiefdom, Bombali District, Northern Province.

=== British Empire Medal (BEM) ===
Military Division

- Lance Corporal Mohammed Jabbi, Royal Sierra Leone Military Forces.
- Sergeant Okerke Johnson, Royal Sierra Leone Military Forces.
- Corporal John Yamba Sesay, Royal Sierra Leone Military Forces.

Civil Division

- Bai Adam, Section Chief, Loko Masama Chiefdom.
- Elme Maidie Beckley. For long and faithful service to primary education.
- John Mosie Lasana. For long and meritorious service in the teaching profession.
- George Yakawa Macauley. for long and meritorious service in the teaching profession.
- Enid Omojola Smart. For long and meritorious service to secondary and primary education.

=== Queen's Police Medal (QPM) ===
- Peterson Augustine Pelham, Chief Superintendent, Sierra Leone Police Force.

== Barbados ==
=== Order of Saint Michael and Saint George ===
==== Knight Commander of the Order of St Michael and St George (KCMG) ====
- Hugh Worrell Springer, CBE. For services to higher education in Barbados and the Commonwealth.

==== Companion of the Order of St Michael and St George (CMG) ====
- Albert John Herbert Hanschell, Puisne Judge.

=== Order of the British Empire ===
==== Commander of the Order of the British Empire (CBE) ====
Civil Division

- Senator Samuel Victor Ashby. For public service.
- Senator Elliott Lisle Ward. For services to the sugar industry and long public service.

==== Officer of the Order of the British Empire (OBE) ====
Civil Division

- Marcel Robert De Verteuil. For services to sport.

=== Queen's Police Medal (QPM) ===
- Girwood Campbell Springer, Deputy Commissioner, Royal Barbados Police Force.

== Mauritius ==
=== Knight Bachelor ===
- Maurice Latour-Adrien, Chief Justice.
- Joseph Guy Forget, CBE, Mauritius Ambassador to France. For political and public services.

=== Order of Saint Michael and Saint George ===
==== Companion of the Order of St Michael and St George (CMG) ====
- Shunmoogum Mootoosamy, Chairman, Public and Police Service Commissions.

=== Order of the British Empire ===
==== Officer of the Order of the British Empire (OBE) ====
Civil Division

- Leckrajmanee Gungah. For voluntary social welfare work.
- Pierre Laurent. For voluntary work and for services in the field of trade and industry.
- Ramnarain Ramsaha, Public Assistance Commissioner, Public Assistance Division, Ministry of Social Security.
- Jalal-Ud-Din Shuja, Veterinary Adviser, Ministry of Agriculture and Natural Resources.
- Marie Georges Herve de Sornay. For services to journalism, art and literature.

==== Member of the Order of the British Empire (MBE) ====
Military Division

- Warrant Officer Class I William Henry Downs, 2nd Light Infantry, lately Regimental Sergeant Major, Special Mobile Force, Mauritius.

Civil Division

- Marie Angelina Jhowry. For political and public services and voluntary social work.
- Jean Alphonse Ravaton. For services in the propagation of local folklore.
- Jagdeho Roodurmun. For social welfare work and for services to co-operative development and rural local government.
- Dorina Laura Magda Simpson. For voluntary social work.

== Fiji ==
=== Order of the British Empire ===
==== Knight Commander of the Order of the British Empire (KBE) ====
Civil Division

- Ratu Etuate Tuivanuavou Tugi Cakobau, CBE, MC, ED, Minister of Labour, Fiji.

==== Commander of the Order of the British Empire (CBE) ====
Civil Division

- Leonard Gray Usher, Mayor of Suva. For outstanding public service.

==== Officer of the Order of the British Empire (OBE) ====
Civil Division

- Andrew Deoki. For political services.
- Adi Laisa Ganilau. For outstanding services to the community.

==== Member of the Order of the British Empire (MBE) ====
Civil Division

- Patrick Tasman Raddock. For services to sport.
- Sethi Narain. For public services.
