= Short refinance =

A short refinance is a United States mortgage refinancing where a lender agrees to refinance a borrower's home for the current market value to avoid foreclosure. The lender agrees to replace the current loan with a new one, and pays off the difference. This new loan typically has a lower balance, and borrowers typically receive a new interest rate, which is often lower than their former rate resulting in a reduced mortgage payments. The bank or lender has to take loss but this is a smaller loss than if they foreclosed on the home. A short refinance is specific to the United States where mortgage law allows such transactions.

Short refinancing typically happens when home prices are declining. A short refinance can take place when the borrower's loan balance is more than the property's worth. For example this happened in the 2008 financial crisis, which stressed the financial system's ability to supply mortgage credit, subsequently limiting the ability of Americans to refinance mortgages and buy homes.

The biggest challenge for a borrower is to get the lender to agree to a short refinance, and when they agree the impact it can have on borrowers credit rating.

== Process and impact ==
Lenders are under no obligation to agree to a short refinancing and it is often considered a risky transaction. Because of this, it can take months and there are no guarantees it can be done. If the borrower's bank does agree to a short refinance, the borrowers credit will not necessarily be negatively affected. In this sense, a short refinance is no better than a short sale. However, this is a much better end result for the borrow than allowing the property to be foreclosed upon. A short sale can affect credit as little as 50 points as opposed to a foreclosure, which could affect credit rating by more than 300 points. A deed in lieu of foreclosure has a much more devastating effect on the borrows credit. In addition, a short sale or short refinance will be recorded with credit bureaus as paid in full or settled for less.

It is very common for homeowners to be misinformed by real estate professionals not familiar with Federal Housing Administration (FHA) guidelines that a short sale or short refinance is no different than a foreclosure; this is untrue, according to United States Department of Housing and Urban Development (HUD). In fact, if a borrower follows FHA guidelines, they can qualify for a new FHA purchase the first day after a short sale.

This however, was not the case with the Making Home Affordable Programs that ran between 2009 and 2016 through the federal government. When using the Home Affordable Foreclosure Alternatives (HAFA) Program, short sales and Deed in lieu of foreclosure did not impact the borrowers credit report as negatively as other programs or options. The Making Home Affordable website said at the time that "Unlike conventional short sales, a HAFA short sale completely releases you from your mortgage debt after selling the property. This means you will no longer be responsible for the amount that falls "short" of the amount you still owe. The deficiency is guaranteed to be waived by the servicer. In a HAFA short sale, your mortgage company works with you to determine an acceptable sale price. HAFA has a less negative effect on your credit score than foreclosure or conventional short sales."

== FHA guidelines ==
Since 2012, Federal Housing Administration short refinance options make it easier for a borrower to short refinance their home. These guidelines were developed to help borrowers with negative equity and who defaulted on their loans through no fault of their own. The new modifications gave more flexibility to mortgage servicers as well as to the originators to help unemployed homeowners. These changes were funded with $50 billion allocated to housing programs by the Troubled Asset Relief Program. These programs were developed to help responsible homeowners, such as those who continually made their payments on time, to avoid foreclosure. Mortgage servicers are under no obligation to entertain a short payoff refinance, which is why most borrowers hired mortgage brokers that employs specialized negotiators to take care of the short negotiating for the borrowers. Once an agreement had been reached, a new FHA lender will be required to refinance the loan.
