= Steven J. Baum P.C. =

Defunct law firm headquartered in New York, United States

- Headquarters: Amherst, NY
- No. of offices: 2
- No. of lawyers: 14
- No. of employees: 89
- Major practice areas: Real estate
- Key people: Steven J. Baum
- Date founded: 1972
- Founder: Marvin R. Baum
- Company type: Professional corporation
- Dissolved: 2011
- Website: www.mbaum.com/SJB/index.jsp

Steven J. Baum, P.C., was a law firm headquartered in Amherst, New York, United States. It was founded as Marvin R. Baum, P.C. in 1972, and remained under that name until Marvin Baum's death in 1999, after which his son Steven inherited the business and renamed it after himself. Its practice was primarily in real estate law, particularly in representing lenders and servicers in residential foreclosure actions in its later years.

In the wake of the subprime mortgage crisis in the late 2000s (decade), Baum handled 40% of all foreclosures in the state, the most of any law firm in New York. Many of the foreclosures it initiated were products of the robo-signing scandal, and it came under state and federal scrutiny. Homeowner activists singled out the firm for its aggressive tactics that ruled out mortgage modifications, and brought class action suits against it. After state courts instituted a rule designed to curtail fraudulent foreclosure filings, a rule the firm had fought in court, new filings by Baum's clients dropped considerably.

The firm came to national attention in 2011 when New York Times columnist Joseph Nocera published photos from the firm's Halloween party the previous year, leaked to him by an employee. They depicted costumes and decoration that mocked homeowners and critics of the firm. Shortly afterwards, Fannie Mae and Freddie Mac barred lenders and servicers from using the firm for foreclosures. State and federal investigations are continuing. Within a week Baum announced it was closing the firm, citing the negative publicity and lost business.

== History ==
Marvin R. Baum founded the firm in 1972. In addition to practicing law in the foreclosure area, he wrote and lectured on the topic and real estate law in general. He chaired the Real Property Law Section of the New York State Bar Association (NYSBA).

His son Steven J. Baum joined the firm in 1986. He chaired the Foreclosure and Workout Committee of the NYSBA. In 1999, when his father died, the firm assumed his name. Shortly afterwards, an associated firm, Pillar Processing LLC, was created to handle document processing. It was later spun off to private equity investors, but was dependent on Baum for almost all its business.

=== 2000s: role in foreclosures and closing ===
Following the subprime mortgage crisis of the late 2000s (decade), foreclosures, originally just one aspect of the firm's business, became its primary business. It became the largest foreclosure firm in the state, involved in 40% of all actions in New York. It opened a satellite office on Long Island, in Westbury, to handle the extra business. Many lawyers for homeowners and consumer activists derisively referred to Baum as a "foreclosure mill", and it was investigated by the state and federal governments for its role in the robo-signing scandal, in which forged documents were filed to initiate actions on behalf of clients who may not have been the original lenders or servicers. A Brooklyn judge said Baum operated "in a parallel mortgage universe, unrelated to the real universe".

The firm later paid the Department of Justice $2 million, and agreed to change its practices, to settle the claims brought against it by Preet Bharara, U.S. Attorney for the Southern District of New York. It admitted no wrongdoing beyond "occasionally [making] inadvertent errors in its legal filings in state and federal court." In October 2010, the state's chief administrative judge imposed a rule requiring clients to affirm the original documents under penalty of perjury. It limited the company's business, and Baum later argued in court that it should be reversed as unconstitutional. The affirmation rule had an adverse effect on homeowners against whom foreclosure notices had been filed: without it, no mediation efforts could begin, and interest and fees continued to accrue, eroding the homeowner's eventual bargaining position.

Baum came to national attention around Halloween 2011, when Joseph Nocera, a columnist at The New York Times, published photographs taken at the firm's Halloween party the previous year that had been sent to him by an employee. The employees were dressed like homeless or poor people, and wore signs around their necks saying things like "3rd Party Squatter – I Lost My Home & I Was NEVER Served", a common response to foreclosure proceedings. Another image depicted a row of mock houses identified as "Baum Estates" with foreclosure notices in front, and a third display imagined the death of a Manhattan attorney who had filed a class action suit against the firm. "There is this really cavalier attitude," Nocera quoted his source as saying. "It doesn't matter that people are going to lose their homes." A spokesman for the firm called the column "another attempt by The New York Times to attack our firm and our work."

The firm apologized after the ensuing uproar, but the controversy did not end. Occupy Buffalo picketed the firm's offices, and urged state attorney general Eric Schneiderman, who had been investigating the firm, to prosecute rather than settle. Both Fannie Mae and Freddie Mac barred servicers from using the firm. Investigations by the United States House of Representatives were also underway.

Three weeks later, Nocera wrote a follow-up column that began by quoting an email he had received from Baum: "You have destroyed everything and everyone related to Steven J. Baum PC. It took 40 years to build this firm and three weeks to tear down," he said. He had asked about Baum's effort to have the affirmation rule overturned. Baum told him that the firm was merely following the wish of one its client servicers, and that the rule was simply "confusing." In a final email, Nocera quoted Baum as saying, "There is blood on your hands for this one, Joe. I will never, ever forgive you for this." Two days later, Baum announced that the firm would close down due to the business lost by the Fannie and Freddie ban.

In March 2012, after the firm closed down, Baum reached a settlement for $4 million (~$5.39 million in 2024) with the State of New York over abuses in their legal work, without admitting any wrongdoing.
