= 2010 United States foreclosure crisis =

United States housing crisis

The 2010 United States foreclosure crisis, sometimes referred to as Foreclosure-gate or Foreclosuregate, refers to a widespread epidemic of improper foreclosures initiated by large banks and other lenders. The foreclosure crisis was extensively covered by news outlets beginning in October 2010, and several large banks—including Bank of America, JPMorgan Chase, Wells Fargo, and Citigroup—responded by halting their foreclosure proceedings temporarily in some or all states. The foreclosure crisis caused significant investor fear in the U.S. A 2014 study published in the American Journal of Public Health linked the foreclosure crisis to an increase in suicide rates.

One out of every 248 households in the United States received a foreclosure notice in September 2012, according to RealtyTrac.

== Background and causes ==
The 2010 United States foreclosure crisis was a direct outcome of the subprime mortgage crisis that began in 2007–2008. During the housing boom, lenders issued mortgages to a wide range of borrowers, including many with weaker credit profiles. A large share of these loans were subprime mortgages that carried higher interest rates and risky terms such as adjustable-rate structures. Many of these mortgages were bundled into mortgage-backed securities and sold to investors, which encouraged continued risk-taking in origination. When housing prices began to fall after 2006, homeowners discovered that they had negative equity, meaning their mortgage balance exceeded the value of their homes. At the same time, unemployment rose after the Great Recession, and credit markets contracted, making it difficult for homeowners to refinance or avoid delinquency. These combined factors created a nationwide wave of defaults and foreclosures.

== Impact ==
In 2010, foreclosure activity reached a record high. RealtyTrac reported that foreclosure-related sales made up nearly 26 percent of all U.S. home sales, and that these properties sold for roughly 28% less than comparable non-foreclosed homes. Nationally, about 1.2 million homes were repossessed that year, the highest annual total on record. The crisis hit certain groups especially hard. Studies found that minority households and fast-growing housing markets suffered the heaviest losses.

This created a negative feedback loop: falling home prices reduced household wealth, which in turn weakened consumer spending and led to further layoffs in construction, retail, and banking. At the community level, areas with concentrated foreclosures saw vacancies rise, property-tax revenues decline, and— in some places—higher crime rates. Local governments faced shrinking budgets that limited support for schools and public services. Commentators sometimes described the hardest-hit areas as “ghost towns.”

== Policy responses ==
In response, the federal government introduced programs to assist homeowners. The Home Affordable Modification Program (HAMP) sought to lower monthly mortgage payments to around 31 percent of income by altering loan terms. By the end of 2010, approximately 800,000 homeowners had received permanent modifications under HAMP. Another initiative, the Home Affordable Refinance Program (HARP) enabled homeowners with underwater loans to refinance. Critics, including housing policy analysts and legal scholars, argued that these programs were too complicated and too limited in scale.

Research on HAMP’s effectiveness has been mixed. Some scholars found that it reduced foreclosure rates, but others concluded that it reached only about one-third of the target population. State-level foreclosure-prevention laws produced modest benefits but were not sufficient to reverse the national crisis.

== Housing market recovery (2011–2015) ==
Beginning around 2012, the U.S. housing market slowly moved out of the foreclosure crisis. After several years of falling prices, the S&P CoreLogic Case-Shiller index showed that national home prices recorded their first yearly gain since 2006, with prices in major cities rising about 7 percent in 2012. At the same time, banks and government-sponsored enterprises began to work through large inventories of foreclosed homes. Fannie Mae, for example, reported that its real-estate-owned (REO) inventory fell by 27 percent in 2011 after rising every year from 2006 to 2010.

Measures of foreclosure distress also improved. CoreLogic’s National Foreclosure Report estimated that the national foreclosure inventory in early 2015 was roughly one-third lower than a year earlier and back to levels last seen in 2008. During this recovery period, large institutional investors and other business buyers purchased many foreclosed single-family homes and converted them to rentals, providing liquidity to distressed markets and influencing local price dynamics.

Despite these signs of recovery, homeownership remained subdued. According to the U.S. Census Bureau, the national homeownership rate fell to about 63 percent in 2015, its lowest level in more than a decade, indicating that many households had not fully regained access to homeownership after the crisis.

== Robo-signing controversy ==
"Robo-signing" is a term used by consumer advocates to describe the rubber-stamp process of mass production of false and forged execution of mortgage assignments, satisfactions, affidavits, and other legal documents related to mortgage foreclosures and legal matters being created by persons without knowledge of the facts being attested to. It also includes accusations of notary fraud wherein the notaries pre- and/or post-notarize the affidavits and signatures of so-called robo-signers.

On October 21, 2010, The Wall Street Journal reported that foreclosure lawyer/advocates Thomas Ice and Matthew Weidner were discussing the deposition testimony of mortgage company employees; Weidner recalled, "Tom and I were talking, and it was, 'Jesus, they're like robots!'" Weidner, a blogger, called them "robo signers" in a January 8, 2010 posting. In 2009, Maine attorney Thomas Cox pointed out the wide-scale practice of robo-signing in depositions taken of GMAC's Jeffrey Stephan and other robo-signers. News outlets reported that on September 14, 2010, Jeffrey Stephan testified that he had signed affidavits which he hadn't actually reviewed on behalf of Ally Financial. This revelation led to increased scrutiny of foreclosure documentation. The practice was apparently common in the mortgage industry. In the weeks following the robo-signing revelation, other large banks came under fire for employing robo-signers as well, including JPMorgan Chase and Bank of America.

In the fall of 2010, major U.S. lenders such as JP Morgan Chase, Ally Financial (formerly known as GMAC), and Bank of America suspended judicial and non-judicial foreclosures across the United States over the potentially fraudulent practice of robo-signing.

On September 21, 2010, HousingWire ran an article citing defects in affidavits used in some foreclosure cases at Ally Financial, formerly known as GMAC Mortgage. "This situation with GMAC isn't limited to GMAC," Margery Golant, of Golant & Golant, a foreclosure law firm in Boca Raton, Florida, said in an interview with HousingWire reporter Jon Prior. "All the mortgage servicers do the same thing. They have people either on the inside or through outsourcers that we call Robo-signers. They just sign everything in sight, but the legal system requires that they actually know the information."

On July 18, 2011, the Associated Press and Reuters released two reports that robo-signing continued to be a major problem in U.S. courtrooms across America. The AP defined robo-signing as a "variety of practices. It can mean a qualified executive in the mortgage industry signs a mortgage affidavit document without verifying the information. It can mean someone forges an executive's signature, or a lower-level employee signs his or her own name with a fake title. It can mean failing to comply with notary procedures. In all of these cases, robo-signing involves people signing documents and swearing to their accuracy without verifying any of the information."

== Role of MERS ==
The Mortgage Electronic Registration Systems, known as MERS, is a privately held company that operates an electronic registry designed to track servicing rights and ownership of mortgage loans in the United States. Since the 2010 crisis, 62 million mortgages are held in the name of MERS, and MERS has initiated thousands of foreclosures in the United States, claiming to be the mortgagee of record. Lawyers have contended in court that MERS has no legal right to initiate a foreclosure, because MERS does not own the loans in question. U.S. lending laws state that only the owner of a loan can initiate a foreclosure. Class action law suits against MERS are pending in California, Nevada, and Arizona. State courts remain sharply divided on the propriety of this practice. State supreme courts in Maine, Arkansas, and Kansas have ruled against MERS right to file for foreclosures. MERS has however won court cases in other states such as Michigan, affirming its right to initiate foreclosures in those states. For example, the Third District Court of Appeals in Florida ruled, in 2007, that "... it is apparent - and we so hold - that no substantive rights, obligations or defenses are affected by the use of the MERS device, [so] there is no reason why mere form should overcome the salutary substance of permitting the use of this commercially effective means of business."

== Attempted legislative fix ==
In an apparent attempt to resolve some of the issues with missing, lost, and sometimes fraudulent paperwork both the United States House of Representatives and the United States Senate passed H.R. 3808 which would force courts to recognize out of state and electronic notarizations. The bill passed the Senate through a voice vote, and without debate. President Barack Obama, fearing "unintended consequences on consumer protections" utilized his veto powers, at first using a pocket veto by simply not signing the bill, and later by issuing a more formal protective-return veto.

The Interstate Recognition of Notarizations (IRON) Act of 2010 would have required “any Federal or State court to recognize any notarization made by a notary public licensed by a State other than the State where the court is located when such notarization occurs in or affects interstate commerce.” The bill, written by U.S. Rep. Robert Aderholt (R-AL) to help court stenographers in his district alleviate issues with getting courts in other states to accept depositions notarized in Alabama, came under criticism in October 2010 from homeowner advocates who said it would have made it easier for mortgage processors to foreclose on homeowners without proper documentation or chain of title.

The first version of the IRON Act (H.R. 1979), sponsored by Aderholt in 2005, passed the House of Representatives in December 2006. The same bill was later sponsored by U.S. Sen. Tom Carper (D-DE) and introduced in the U.S. Senate Judiciary Committee as S.2083 in 2007, but it ultimately stalled. The bill was again sponsored by Aderholt (R-AL) and introduced in the U.S. House of Representatives as H.R. 3808 on October 14, 2009. It passed by voice vote in the House on April 27, 2010. The bill was co-sponsored by Rep. Bruce Braley (D-IA), Rep. Mike Castle (R-DE) and Rep. Artur Davis (D-AL). The bill was voted on in the U.S. Senate on Sept. 27 at the urging of Senate Judiciary Chairman Patrick Leahy (D-VT). Leahy's staff said that they had received calls from "constituents" pressing for passage of the bill. But Leahy may have supported the bill after being lobbied by notaries at a September event in D.C. honoring President Calvin Coolidge.

Sen. Robert Casey (D-PA), who was ushering through many pieces of last-minute legislation on behalf of the Democratic leadership on the final day before the Senate adjourned for recess, moved the bill from the Judiciary committee for a vote. Sen. Jeff Sessions (R-AL) helped gather Republican support for the bill. The Senate then passed the bill by unanimous consent without debate. Aderholt said that he and supporters “were surprised that it came through at the eleventh hour there” in the Senate. President Obama vetoed the bill on Oct. 8, following outcry from homeowner advocates and increased scrutiny from the press.

Ohio's Secretary of State, Democrat Jennifer Brunner, emerged as one of the earliest critics of the bill, calling the timing of its passage “suspicious.” Brunner organized opposition to the bill, urging citizens to call and email the President and tell him not to sign the act. CNBC senior editor John Carney called the bill “mysterious” and wrote that the bill “might bail out banks such as GMAC, JP Morgan Chase and Bank of America from their foreclosure gate troubles.”

Aderholt defended his bill in a statement: “There is absolutely no connection whatsoever between the Interstate Recognition of Notarizations Act of 2010 and the recent foreclosure documentation problems... The bill expressly requires lawful notarizations, and in no way validates improper notarizations. Enforcement of legal notarizations is a state responsibility and I fully support each state attorney general vigorously prosecuting all notarization fraud.”

== Legal action against banks ==
=== National Mortgage Settlement ===
On February 9, 2012, it was announced that the five largest mortgage servicers (Ally/GMAC, Bank of America, Citi, JPMorgan Chase, and Wells Fargo) agreed to a historic settlement with the federal government and 49 states. The settlement, known as the National Mortgage Settlement (NMS), required the servicers to provide about $26 billion in relief to distressed homeowners and in direct payments to the states and federal government. This settlement amount makes the NMS the second largest civil settlement in U.S. history, only trailing the Tobacco Master Settlement Agreement. The five banks were also required to comply with 305 new mortgage servicing standards. Oklahoma under then-Attorney General Scott Pruitt held out and agreed to settle with the banks separately.

Joseph A. Smith, Jr., the North Carolina Commissioner of Banks, was tapped to be the Settlement Monitor. He created the Office of Mortgage Settlement Oversight (OMSO) to ensure the banks were providing relief to homeowners and complying with the new mortgage servicing standards as required by the NMS.

=== National SunTrust Settlement ===
The Federal government together with state attorneys general in 49 states and the District of Columbia reached a settlement in 2014 requiring SunTrust Mortgage, Inc., to provide $500 million (~$651 million in 2024) in various forms of relief to borrowers. The United States District Court for the District of Columbia entered the Consent Order on September 30, 2014. The consent order addressed SunTrust's alleged misconduct regarding its mortgage servicing and foreclosure practices. SunTrust was also required to create a 40 million dollar fund for the approximately 45,000 SunTrust borrowers who were foreclosed upon between January 1, 2008, and December 31, 2013. In addition, SunTrust was required to adhere to significant new homeowner protections. The consent order required that SunTrust follow the servicing standards set up by the 2012 National Mortgage Settlement (NMS) with the five largest banks.

=== Ocwen National Servicing Settlement ===
The Consumer Financial Protection Bureau (CFPB), together with attorneys general and state banking regulators in 49 states, and the District of Columbia obtained a Consent Judgment requiring Ocwen Financial Corporation—who at the time, was the largest nonbank mortgage loan servicer in the country—and its subsidiary, Ocwen Loan Servicing, to provide $2 billion in first lien principal reduction to underwater borrowers. The consent order addressed Ocwen's misconduct during the mortgage servicing process. It also covered two companies previously purchased by Ocwen, Litton Loan Servicing LP (“Litton”) and Homeward Residential Holdings LLC (previously known as American Home Mortgage Servicing, Inc. or AHMSI). Ocwen was also required to pay $125 million to the nearly 185,000 Ocwen, Litton, and Homeward borrowers who had been foreclosed upon and well as being required to adhere to significant new homeowner protections.

== See also ==
- 2008 financial crisis
- Bankruptcy remote – a desired feature of vehicles like REMICS
- Chain of title
- Independent foreclosure review
- Occupy Homes – a protest movement in order to save foreclosed homes.
- Real estate mortgage investment conduit (REMIC)
- Shadow banking system
