= Occupy Buffalo =

American protest movement

- Part of the "Occupy" protests
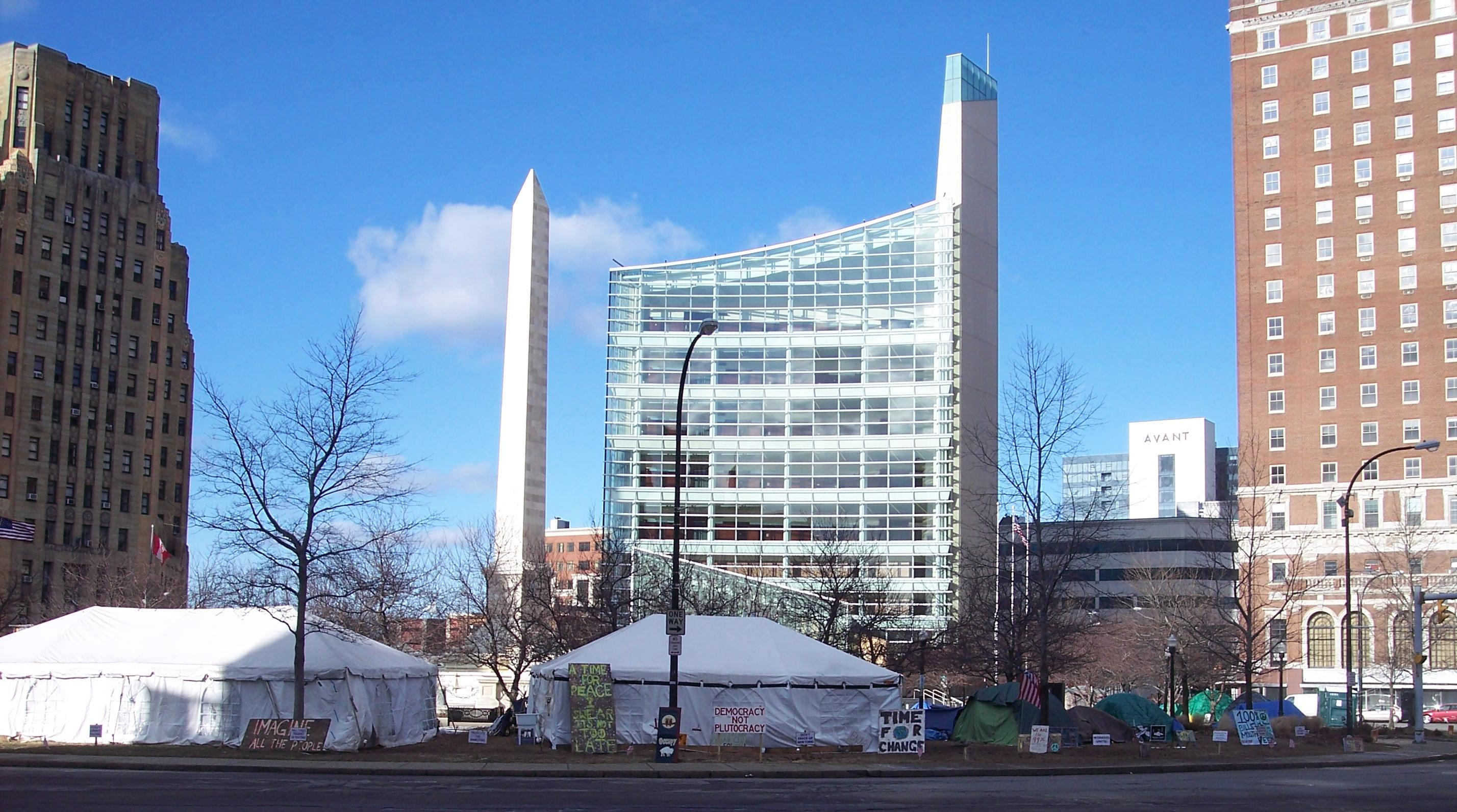
- Occupy Buffalo protesters camp, Niagara Square, Buffalo, New York
- Date: 1 October 2011 – 2 February 2012
- Location: Buffalo, New York; 42.8864468°N 78.8780911°W
- Caused by: Economic inequality, income inequality, corporate influence over government, unemployment, Peace
- Methods: Demonstration, occupation, protest, street protesters
- Status: Defeated

Arrests and injuries
- Injuries: 0
- Arrested: 11

Occupy Buffalo was a collaboration that included a peaceful protest and demonstrations which began on October 1, 2011, in Buffalo, New York, in Niagara Square, the nexus of downtown Buffalo opposite the Buffalo City Hall. It is related to the Occupy Wall Street movement that began in New York City on September 17, and called for economic equity, accountability among politicians and ending lobbyist influence of politicians. Protesters camped overnight in Niagara Square as part of the demonstration.

Until August 2012, Occupy Buffalo had continued to engage in organized meetings, events and actions, according to their official site (now archived). As of September 18, 2019, their Facebook page continues to be active in sharing photos, events, and information.

== JPMorgan Chase ==
On May 30, 2012, City Comptroller Mark J. F. Schroeder announced the City of Buffalo was withdrawing $45 million from JPMorgan Chase and depositing the money with First Niagara Financial Group. The move followed concerns about JPMorgan Chase raised with the Common Council by members of the Occupy Buffalo movement, who asked that the city withdraw its deposits from the institution and invest the money in a local bank. "Not only will the funds earn more interest with First Niagara, a major local employer headquartered in Buffalo, but it also sends a crystal-clear message to JPMorgan Chase that the City of Buffalo is not happy with their business practices," said Schroeder. JPMorgan Chase revealed a $2 billion trading loss earlier that month, and its Main Place Tower office downtown has been the site of multiple demonstrations by Occupy Buffalo since October 2011.

== Protest ==
An early target of the protesters included the Steven J. Baum P.C. law firm in the Buffalo suburb of Amherst. As the largest foreclosure law firm in the state, it had been criticized by activists and fellow lawyers for its aggressive focus on foreclosure without any effort to secure modifications where homeowners or businesses might be eligible. The firm also brought about criticism from their use of questionable robo-signed documents until a change in state court rules requiring an affirmation by the lawyer or client, greatly curtailed its new filings. Baum had attracted national attention after New York Times columnist Joseph Nocera published photos taken of its employees at its 2010 Halloween party, where costumes and decor ridiculed the homeless and attacked the firm's critics. A week after Occupy Buffalo picketed Baum's offices, the firm shut down due to a loss of business after Fannie Mae and Freddie Mac forbade mortgage servicers from using the firm for foreclosure actions.

== Relation with the city ==
Compared to other cities where the Occupy movement has taken root, Occupy Buffalo's relations with the city were relatively amicable. The occupiers and the city had a contract that allowed the group to encamp in Niagara Square, which expired February 2, 2012. On November 14, 2011, the protestors marched from the Niagara Square to various police and Sheriff's Office buildings to show their appreciation for the Buffalo Police. During December 2011, the city allowed the installation of a 20-foot geodesic dome on the southwest portion of Niagara Square.

=== Medea Benjamin ===
On July 7, 2012, after rallying in front of City Hall Medea Benjamin, members of Occupy Buffalo and the Western New York Peace Center presented legislation to Buffalo Common Council to keep drones out of the skies in Buffalo stating, "Armed drones and surveillance drones present an unreasonable an unacceptable threat to the rights of individual privacy, freedom of association and assembly, equal protection and judicial due process in the City of Buffalo."

=== Michael Moore ===
On November 17, 2011, filmmaker Michael Moore spoke directly to members of Occupy Buffalo in a YouTube video encouraging them make their voice heard and not to pull back on their efforts despite the winter weather approaching.

=== Controversy ===
Following the eviction of Chris Phillips on December 26, 2011, for moving to Lafayette Square, and of Steve Norris on January 5, 2012, for allegedly speaking to a reporter from WKBW without authorization, both individuals were helping a Facebook-based group named "Liberate Buffalo" to evict the group. Both individuals launched online campaign against the OB, went to local city politicians e.g. Councilmember Richard Fontana who was known to be against Occupy, and spoke to radio and newspaper reporters about alleged violations of various city ordinances and codes on top of unaccountability concerning the group finances. As a result, there was an animosity within City Hall ranks towards Occupy Buffalo, a fact that contributed to the group getting booted from Niagara Square.

=== Lafayette Square ===
A half dozen individuals left Niagara Square and attempted to encamp in Lafayette Square without discussing their action with the rest of the group before doing so. The splinter group informed the media that Occupy Buffalo was expanding. Occupy Buffalo released a statement disassociating itself with the individuals who left stating they falsely represented Occupy Buffalo to the media and that Occupy Buffalo would continue to honor the agreement with the city and remain in Niagara Square only; On December 22, 2011, the Buffalo Police Department evicted the group from Lafayette Square with one arrest.

=== Eviction ===
On February 2, 2012, after 2am Buffalo Police forced demonstrators out of Niagara Square as a swat team waited on standby. Ten protesters who sat on the sidewalk and refused to leave were arrested for trespassing and disorderly conduct. The disorderly conduct charges were later dropped pending conditional terms.

== Timeline ==
- October 1, 2011: The first general assembly occurred.
- October 8, 2011: The second general assembly was held and later in the evening the first tents were pitched in the park.
- November 14, 2011: The protestors marched to various police and Sheriff's Office buildings to show their appreciation for the Buffalo Police
- December 9, 2011: A formal agreement for the ongoing, peaceful occupation of Niagara square is reached between the protestors and the city of Buffalo.
- December 22, 2011: The Buffalo Police Department evicted splinter group from Lafayette Square
- February 2, 2012: The permit for occupation of Niagara square expires and the Occupy Buffalo demonstrators are evicted.

Post Eviction

- May 21, 2014: Had an event to vote on donating Occupy Buffalo's bank account to an ill man.

== Gallery ==
Occupy Buffalo

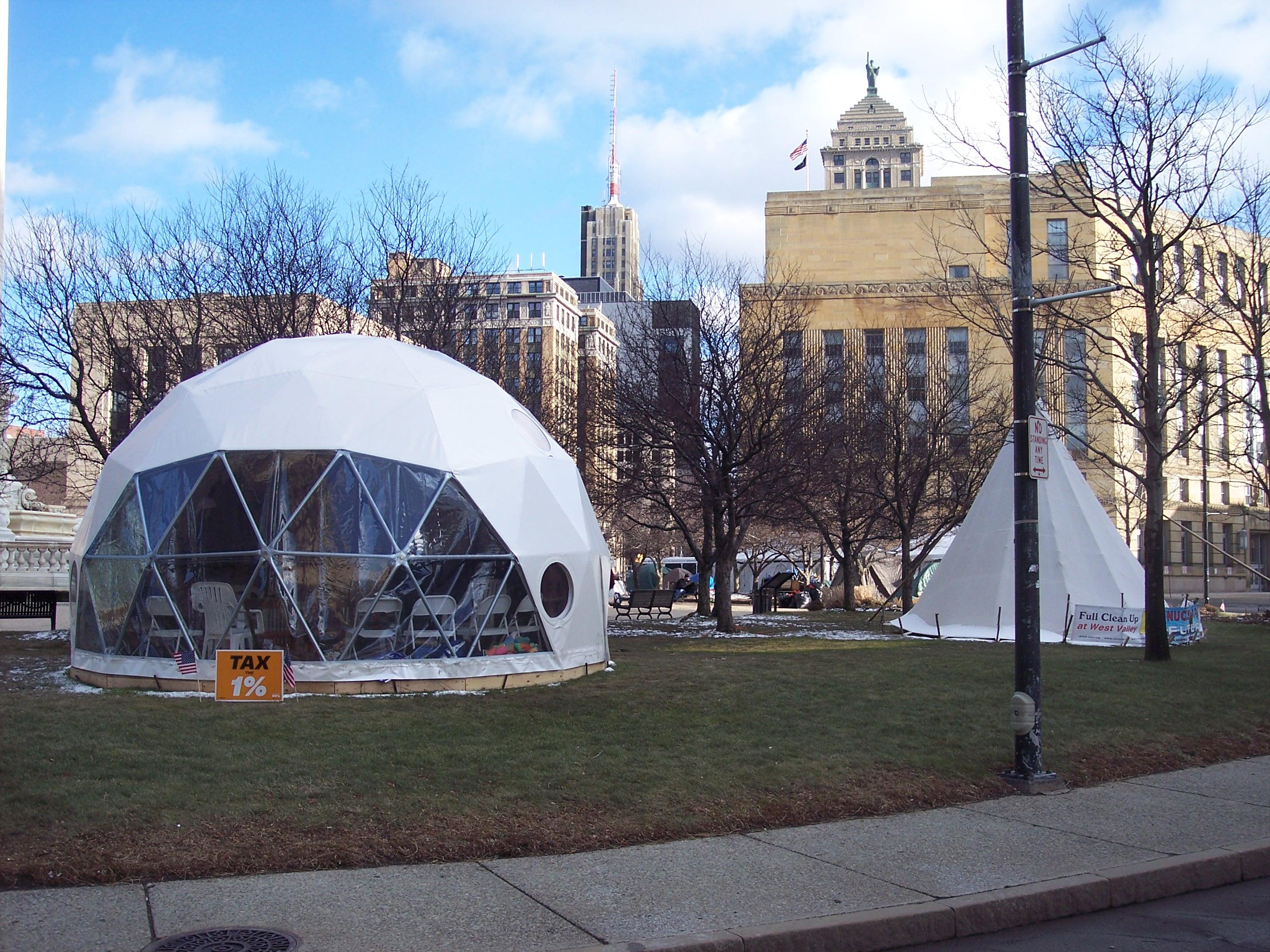
Igloo and Tipi

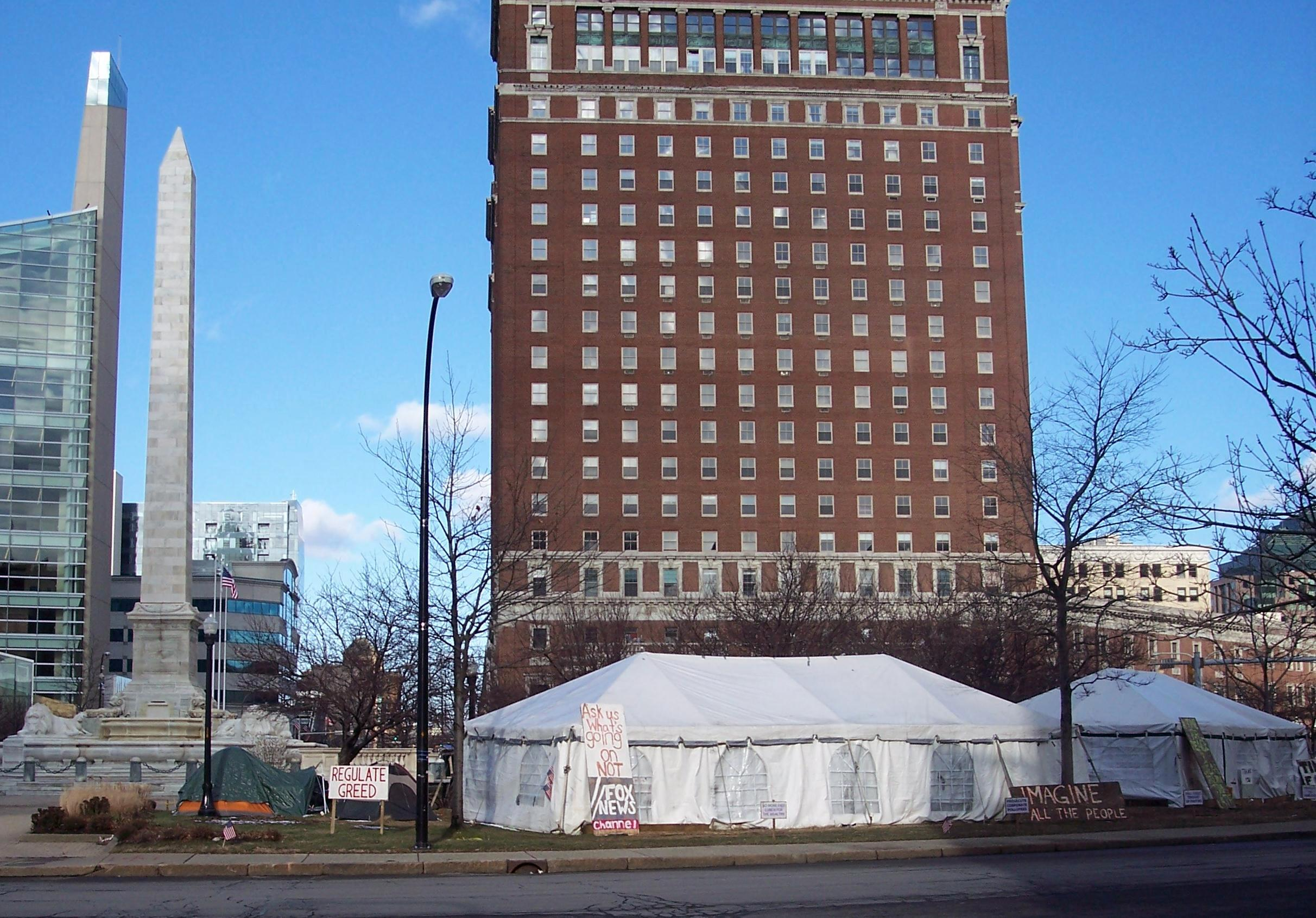
Occupy Buffalo protesters camp, Niagara Square, Buffalo New York

== See also ==
Occupy articles

- List of global Occupy protest locations
- Occupy movement
- Timeline of Occupy Wall Street
- We are the 99%

Other Protests

- 15 October 2011 global protests
- 2011 United States public employee protests
- 2011 Wisconsin protests

Related articles

- Arab Spring
- Corruption Perceptions Index
- Economic inequality
- Grassroots movement
- Income inequality in the United States
- Lobbying
- Plutocracy
- Tea Party protests
- Wealth inequality in the United States
