= Loss mitigation =

Loss mitigation is used to describe a third party helping a homeowner, a division within a bank that mitigates the loss of the bank, or a firm that handles the process of negotiation between a homeowner and the homeowner's lender. Loss mitigation works to negotiate mortgage terms for the homeowner that will prevent foreclosure. These new terms are typically obtained through loan modification, short sale negotiation, short refinance negotiation, deed in lieu of foreclosure, cash-for-keys negotiation, a partial claim loan, repayment plan, forbearance, or other loan work-out. All of these options aim to reduce financial risks for the lender (or investor).

== Kinds of loss mitigation ==
- Loan modification: This is a process whereby a homeowner's mortgage is modified and both lender and homeowner are bound by the new terms. The most common modifications are lowering the interest rate and extending the term to up to 40 years. Reduction in the principal balance, however, is so rare that the Federal Reserve wrote in a report that they could find no evidence that lenders were reducing principal balances on mortgages.
- Short sale: This is a process whereby a lender accepts a payoff that is less than the principal balance of a homeowner's mortgage, in order to permit the homeowner to sell the home for the actual market value of the home. This specifically applies to homeowners that owe more on their mortgage than the property is worth. Without such a principal reduction the homeowner would not be able to sell the home.
- Short refinance: This is a process whereby a lender reduces the principal balance of a homeowner's mortgage in order to permit the homeowner to refinance with a new lender. The reduction in principal is designed to meet the Loan-to-value guidelines of the new lender (which makes refinancing possible).
- Deed in lieu: A Deed in Lieu of foreclosure (DIL) is a disposition option in which a mortgagor voluntarily deeds collateral property in exchange for a release from all obligations under the mortgage. A DIL of foreclosure may not be accepted from mortgagors who can financially make their mortgage payments.
- Cash-for-keys negotiation: The lender will pay the homeowner or tenant to vacate the home in a timely fashion without destroying the property after foreclosure. The lender does this to avoid incurring the additional expenses involved in evicting such occupants.
- Special Forbearance - This is where you will make no monthly payment or a reduced monthly payment. Sometimes, the lender will ask you to be put on a repayment plan when the forbearance has been finished to pay back what you missed, while other times they just modify your loan.
- Partial Claim - Under the Partial Claim option, a mortgagee will advance funds on behalf of a mortgagor in an amount necessary to reinstate a delinquent loan (not to exceed the equivalent of 12 months PITI). The mortgagor will execute a promissory note and subordinate mortgage payable to United States Department of Housing and Urban Development (HUD). Currently, these promissory or "Partial Claim" notes assess no interest and are not due and payable until the mortgagor either pays off the first mortgage or no longer owns the property.

== Benefits ==
The most common benefit to the homeowner is the prevention of foreclosure because loss mitigation works to either relieve the homeowner of the debt or create a mortgage resolution that is financially sustainable for the homeowner. Lenders benefit by mitigating the losses they would incur through foreclosing on the homeowner. Immediate foreclosure creates a tremendous financial burden on the lender.

== History and causes ==
Loss mitigation has been a tool used by lenders for decades, but experienced tremendous growth since late 2006. This rapid expansion was in response to the dramatic increase in foreclosures nationwide. Prior to late 2006, early 2007; Loss Mitigation was a tiny department within most lending institutions. In fact, the run up prior to the near collapse of the entire financial system shows Loss Mitigation was almost nonexistent. The ten-year period prior to 2007 spurred rapid year over year increases in home prices caused by low interest rates and low underwriting standards. Loss Mitigation was only needed for extreme cases due to the homeowners ability to repeatedly refinance and avoid defaulting.

Beginning in 2007 the mortgage industry nearly collapsed. Large numbers of lenders went out of business and the rest were forced to eliminate all of the loan programs that were most prone to foreclosure. These foreclosures were mostly caused by the packaging and selling of subprime and other risky mortgages. The transfer of ownership from mortgage lender to third party investor proved to be disastrous. Lenders wrote risky loans and sold them without being directly affected by the borrowers inability to pay. This practice prompted mortgage lenders to lower the requirements of mortgage approval to the lowest levels in history. Lenders sold pools of these mortgage loans to investment firms who packaged and resold them in the market in the form of bond issues. The investment firms weren't naive to the quality of the mortgages, so they purchased credit default swaps (a type of insurance product without technically being insurance) for protection of inevitable default. In fact, credit default swaps were created during this time and didn't exist prior to the housing boom. This resulted in millions of unqualified people obtaining mortgages. Another major factor of "mortgage meltdown" was caused by the Bond Rating Agencies. The agencies rated subprime mortgage pools as "investment grade" which opened up an almost unlimited supply of large investors (mutual funds, pension funds and even countries)to purchase these bond issues (The investment grade rating duped money managers into thinking the bonds were less risky than they actually were). When homeowners began to default on their mortgage payments the bonds were proven to be too risky for investment. This led investment companies to cease purchasing newly originated mortgage pools. In addition, investment firms came to see that the credit default swaps weren't true protection and were essentially worthless. The lenders could no longer sell off the newly originated mortgages. This halted the regeneration of capital necessary for these mortgage banks to lend money. In fact, well over 200 mortgage banks were either forced to close or went bankrupt. This crisis was dubbed the "Credit Crunch" and the subprime mortgage crisis.

The surviving lenders were faced with mounting losses from foreclosures. In addition, they had to depend solely on lending capital derived from deposits. This environment forced the drastic tightening of lending guidelines.

This resulted in millions of people to be unqualified to refinance out of their risky subprime, adjustable rate and negative amortization loans. Many people suffered dramatic payment increases. At the same time, housing prices plummeted due to the "housing correction" That was fueled by record foreclosures. Based on RealtyTrac data, since December 2007 and through June 2010 there have been a total of 2.36 million U.S. properties repossessed by lenders through foreclosure (REO). In addition there have been 3.48 million default notices and 3.46 million scheduled foreclosure auctions. This major increase of properties on the market decreased home values creating a market with fewer qualified borrowers than homes for sale. When there is less demand the prices drop. Home values were at highly inflated levels prior to this due to historically low interest rates and the steady decline of credit requirements for the homeowner to qualify for a mortgage. Many homeowners found themselves with negative equity meaning the mortgage balance was considerably higher than the market value of the home also known as being "underwater". Many homeowners elected to default voluntarily on their mortgage. Being "underwater" means their home is no longer an asset to them. With all this stacked against them and very few options, the result for many was default and foreclosure or loss mitigation.

Loss Mitigation can be negotiated directly by the homeowner or an attorney. Be careful of fraudulent claims by third parties, a 2008 study by Professor Alan M White found that of 4,342 modifications that he studied, only 62 received principal reductions.

Still feeling the blow, this has led to a loss of equity (from inflated levels) for every homeowner in the country. With less equity homeowners are less likely to qualify for a loan that will refinance them out of a risky loan; with less equity less homeowners are able to qualify for home equity line of credits or a second mortgage in order to pay for financial emergencies.
