= Seth Wheeler =

American businessman

Seth Wheeler is an American businessman and former policy advisor. In the Bush administration, he helped coordinate the federal response to housing crisis related to the Great Recession. In the Obama White House, he was Special Assistant to the President for Economic Policy and Senior Advisor for Financial Services, and is currently an employee at JPMorgan Chase.

== Career ==
Wheeler graduated from Brigham Young University with a B.A. in Economics & Asian Studies, later earning an M.B.A. and a J.D. from Harvard Business School and Columbia Law School. After his time in the private sector at Bain and Morgan Stanley, he moved into the public sector in the Bush administration in the US Treasury Department, and continued into the Obama administration as the highest paid advisor in the Obama White House. He also spent time at The Brookings Institution as a Guest Scholar on Financial Innovation.

== Response to Housing Crisis ==
Wheeler came onto the Treasury Department in 2007 to help with the subprime mortgage crisis and stayed for two and a half years. His main accomplishment was contributing to the Home Affordable Modification Program. The purpose of this program was to ease the impact of the foreclosure of homes of millions of homeowners by providing refinancing options. The program ran into implementation issues related to the operational details of refinancing, though it did help refinance the mortgages of more than 200 thousand homeowners. He is said to have left the public sector for personal reasons.
