= Streamline refinancing =

Mortgage refinancing process in the U.S. for Federal Housing Administration mortgages

Streamline refinancing is a mortgage refinancing process in the United States for Federal Housing Administration (FHA) mortgages that reuses the original loan's paperwork allowing quicker refinancing. The program was introduced by the FHA as a way to speed up the home refinancing process. By reusing the original loan's paperwork, the process to refinance a home was reduced from a few months to only a few weeks. Streamline refinancing has become more popular because reuse of the original home's appraisal may be the only way someone underwater on the property can refinance it at all.

Streamline refinancing is an option for borrowers who want to take advantage of low interest rates, get out of an adjustable rate mortgage (ARM) or graduated payment mortgage (GPM). Both the FHA and VA offer streamline refinancing for home mortgages.

== Risks ==
Banks are taking the risk that the home will not sell for more than is owed against it if they must foreclose on it. Streamline refinancing programs may allow at-risk borrowers to stay in their homes, but it does not solve the underlying problem of people who bought far too much house for their budget. The streamline refinancing process typically does not require verification of the level of income, only that someone has income. Permitting someone to live on Social Security Disability or unemployment to refinance the home may make the payments manageable, but the debt will be paid off more slowly and the borrower may be better off in the long run moving to a cheaper locale.

FHA and VA streamline is a true no cost loan. The costs are paid with the funds obtained from the new servicer of the loan; as FHA and VA (no income/no credit) streamlines are designed that way. Since the rate is higher than the market is offering, the future servicers will pay more for that loan--and those extra funds are what pays the customer's costs in these cases. If the fees are added into the loan then the customer has to qualify again; as it is not considered a streamline.

While the FHA does not require a credit report to refinance an FHA loan, FHA approved lenders are free to set minimum credit scores.

== Benefits ==
The Federal Housing Administration and VA do not permit the refinancing of a home unless there is a net benefit to the borrower. This net benefit is a reduction of five percent or more in the monthly house payment, including principal, interest and mortgage insurance.

Adjustable rate mortgages are dangerous because their interest rate could spike to five or ten percent, especially for sub-prime borrowers whose loans started with low teaser adjustable rates but compensate by charging several times the official interest rate later. The only exception to this net benefit rule is when someone refinances to a fixed rate mortgage from an adjustable rate mortgage. In that case, the new interest rate may actually be higher than the ARM interest rate.

Streamline refinancing reuses the original paperwork from a home loan, allowing someone to refinance the property before private mortgage insurance (PMI) or insurance rates rise.

The FHA streamline refinancing program requires no repairs be made to the property except for the removal of lead-based paint. For example, repairs to a roof, foundation or electrical wiring are not required for an FHA streamline refinancing.

The FHA streamline refinancing program does not permit home owners to receive equity back as cash. The borrower can receive no more than $500 in minor adjustments in closing. Sellers are allowed to contribute up to 6% of the sales price of the home to the closing costs.

There are additional loans available for making energy efficiency improvements or repairs to the property. The 203(k) is a rehabilitation mortgage. The 203(k) mortgage has a cap of $35,000 for making repairs to a property.

== Concerns ==
The Federal Housing Administration has been continually changing the mortgage insurance rate it charges. The up front mortgage insurance premium and ongoing mortgage premiums the FHA charges are partially based on the loan to value (LTV) ratio of the loan as well as dependent on the number of loans the FHA has seen default. In this case, the FHA streamline refinancing program's PMI and up front mortgage insurance rates are set by factors borrowers cannot control. And the FHA changed its terms to make mortgage insurance last at least eleven years for those with a loan to value ratio of 90%, while those with a loan to value ratio greater than 90% will pay mortgage insurance over the entire life of the loan. The FHA loan changes that went into effect June 2013 mean that the mortgage insurance on these loans can no longer be cancelled when the borrower has reached 22% equity. The VA does not have the same mortgage insurance mandates as the FHA, though it does have closing costs.

The net benefit rule means that borrowers cannot refinance from a 30-year note to a 15-year note even if the monthly house payment would be the same, though such a change would allow them to build equity much faster. This is true for both the VA and FHA.

The up front mortgage insurance premium or UFMIP the FHA charges is due at closing. The FHA UFMIP is partially refunded if the borrower refinances through the FHA streamline refinance program. This can lead people to refinance with the FHA to avoid refinancing costs, though better deals may be available on the open market.

You cannot use the FHA streamline refinancing program if you are delinquent on the mortgage. For those who are behind, programs like HARP and HARP 2 may be the only option.

The Veteran's Administration streamline refinancing program has high refinancing fees, but these fees can be waived for disabled veterans and the surviving spouses of deceased veterans.

== Limits ==
Borrowers are only eligible for a mortgage streamline refinance without credit verification if they have owned the home for at least six months. If the borrower has lived in the house for at less than a year, the mortgage payment history must be perfect to be considered for a streamline refinance.

Furthermore, borrowers cannot use the streamline refinance program for at least 270 days after a previous refinancing. The VA only permits veterans or the surviving spouses of veterans to use the streamline refinancing program. A veteran who divorces can refinance the home in their own name, but the ex-spouse who is not a veteran cannot take over the mortgage.

== See also ==
- Refinancing
