= Trade-In Protection =

Trade-In Protection refers to an automotive protection program that assists in paying off vehicle trade-in negative equity if loyalty occurs by the consumer to either the original selling dealership or automotive manufacturer by trading-in and purchasing another vehicle from the original provider.

The most common type of Trade-In Protection (or TIP) occurs at the dealership level, at the vehicle-buying transaction. Dealers either give away the entire TIP protection (up to $5000 in negative equity benefit), or give away a portion while leaving the balance to be purchased by the consumer ($2500 give away, $2500 for sale).

Trade-In Protection falls in a vein of "socially responsible" programs highlighted by the original Hyundai "Assurance" program of 2009. Since then, additional programs have come to market, including the dealer-level Trade-In Protection, Ford "Advantage," General Motors' "Total Confidence," Subarus' Guaranteed Trade-In Program (GTP), and various forms of payment protection plans for job loss and other factors resulting in the ability for consumers to make scheduled auto loan payments or protect resale values (equity).
