= Home Affordable Refinance Program =

The Home Affordable Refinance Program (HARP) is a federal program of the United States, set up by the Federal Housing Finance Agency in March 2009, to help underwater and near-underwater homeowners refinance their mortgages. Unlike the Home Affordable Modification Program (HAMP), which assists homeowners who are in danger of foreclosure, this program benefits homeowners whose mortgage payments are current, but who cannot refinance due to dropping home prices in the wake of the U.S. housing market correction.

== Background ==
Millions of borrowers found themselves in a difficult predicament after the U.S. housing bubble burst in 2008. As inventories soared nationwide, home prices plummeted. Many new homeowners saw the value of their homes drop below the balance of their mortgages, or nearly so. Later, these same homeowners were prevented from taking advantage of lower interest rates through refinancing, since banks traditionally require a loan-to-value ratio (LTV) of 80% or less to qualify for refinancing without private mortgage insurance (PMI).

Take for example a house that was purchased for $160,000 but is now worth $100,000 due to the market decline. Further, assume the homeowner owes $120,000 on the mortgage. In this scenario, the loan-to-value ratio would be 120%, and if the homeowner chose to refinance, he would also have to pay for private mortgage insurance. If the homeowner were not already paying for PMI, the added cost could nullify much of the benefit of refinancing, so the homeowner could be effectively prohibited from refinancing.

== Program ==
The Home Affordable Refinance Program (HARP) was created by the Federal Housing Finance Agency in March 2009 to allow those with a loan-to-value ratio exceeding 80% to refinance without also paying for mortgage insurance. Originally, only those with an LTV of 105% could qualify. Later that same year, the program was expanded to include those with an LTV up to 125%. This meant that if someone owed $125,000 on a property that is currently worth $100,000, he would still be able to refinance and lock in a lower interest rate.

In December 2011, the rule was changed yet again, creating what is referred to as "HARP 2.0"; there would no longer be any limit on negative equity for mortgages up to 30 years – so even those owing more than 125% of their home value could refinance without PMI. Also, the program was expanded to accept homeowners with PMI on their loan. Finally, any new mortgage lender was guaranteed not to be held responsible for fraud committed on the original loan. This greatly expanded the willingness of lenders to participate in the program.

=== Qualifying criteria ===
Certain criteria must be met to qualify for HARP. While there may be additional criteria imposed by the mortgage servicer, the government requirements are as follows:

- The mortgage must be owned or guaranteed by Freddie Mac or Fannie Mae. Many homeowners are unaware that their mortgages are linked to one of these organizations, since neither Freddie Mac nor Fannie Mae deals directly with the public.
- The mortgage must have been acquired by Freddie Mac or Fannie Mae on or before May 31, 2009.
- The homeowner must not have a previous HARP refinance of the mortgage, unless it is a Fannie Mae loan that was refinanced under HARP during March–May 2009.
- The homeowner must be current on their mortgage payments, with no (30-day) late payments in the last six months and no more than one late payment in the last twelve months.
- The current loan-to-value ratio (LTV) of the property must be greater than 80%.
- The homeowner must benefit from the loan by either lower monthly payments or movement to a more stable product (such as going from an adjustable-rate mortgage (ARM) to a fixed-rate mortgage).

=== HARP 2.0 and PMI ===
Many people who purchased their home with a down payment of less than 20% of the purchase price were required to have private mortgage insurance (PMI). This is common practice with Freddie Mac or Fannie Mae loans. Having PMI attached to a loan made that loan easier to sell on the Wall Street secondary market as a "whole loan". PMI hedged the risk brought by the high loan-to-value ratio by offering insurance against foreclosure for whoever owned the "whole loan".

Although HARP 2.0 allows homeowners with PMI to apply through the Making Home Affordable Refinance Program, many homeowners have faced difficulty refinancing with their original lender. HARP requires the new loan to provide the same level of mortgage insurance coverage as the original loan. This can be difficult and time-consuming, especially in the case of lender-paid private mortgage insurance (LPMI). As a result, many lenders are reluctant to refinance a PMI mortgage.

Fortunately, HARP 2.0 enables homeowners to go to any lender to refinance, so the mortgage holder is not stymied if the original bank is unwilling to pursue a HARP refinance.

=== Occupancy type ===
HARP 2.0 refinancing is allowed on all occupancy types: primary residence (owner-occupied), second home, or investment (rental) property. However, HARP 2.0 refinancing of investment properties by Fannie Mae and Freddie Mac has higher mortgage rates than for owner-occupied properties.

=== Appraisal waiver ===
Another feature of HARP is that applicants can forgo a home appraisal if a reliable automated valuation model is available in the area. This can save the borrower time and money, but is subject to the discretion of the mortgage servicer.

=== HARP 3.0 ===
As part of the 2012 State of the Union Address, President Barack Obama referenced a plan to give "every responsible homeowner the chance to save about $3,000 a year on their mortgage". Within the mortgage industry, this plan is being referred to as HARP 3.0. The plan has not passed. HARP 3.0 is expected to expand HARP's eligibility requirements to homeowners with non-Fannie Mae and non-Freddie Mac mortgages, including homeowners with jumbo mortgages and Alt-A mortgages, those whose original mortgages were stated income, stated asset, or both.

=== Deadline ===
Although the HARP program was originally scheduled to end on December 31, 2016, the Federal Housing Agency announced in August 2016 that it would be extended though September 2017. The program was extended again on August 17, 2017, through December 2018.

== See also ==
- Loan modification in the United States
- United States housing market correction
- Home Affordable Modification Program (HAMP)
