= Independent foreclosure review =

U.S. initiative to provide aid to homeowners

The independent foreclosure review was an initiative in the United States to attempt to provide aid to homeowners who had either received their Notice of Default, or were in danger of foreclosure in early 2010's. The review was initiated as a result of the Foreclosure Crisis of 2010. The Independent Foreclosure Review provided homeowners the opportunity to request an independent review of their foreclosure process. If the review found that financial injury occurred because of errors or other problems during their home foreclosure process, the homeowners could receive compensation or other remedy.

The initiative was initially established as part of a consent order with federal bank regulators, the Office of the Comptroller of the Currency (OCC), the Office of Thrift Supervision (OTS) (independent bureaus of the U.S. Department of the Treasury), and the Board of Governors of the Federal Reserve System. Fourteen mortgage servicers and their affiliates were instructed to identifying customers who were part of a foreclosure action on their primary residence between January 1, 2009, and December 31, 2010.

The Federal Reserve announced on April 9, 2013, that Rust Consulting would begin mailing out checks on April 12, 2013.

On April 25, 2013, Representative Elijah Cummings introduced legislation to create a monitor for the Independent Foreclosure Review: HR 1706, "The Mortgage Settlement Monitoring Act of 2013"

== Background and timeline ==
=== Establishment of the review ===
The Independent Foreclosure Review was created in response to the Foreclosure Crisis of 2010 in an attempt to provide aid to homeowners who had either received their Notice of Default, or were in danger of foreclosure.

The third-party consultant assessed whether any errors, misrepresentations, or other deficiencies resulted in financial injury to borrowers. Where a borrower suffered financial injury as a result of such practices, the consent orders required remediation to be provided. During the review, customers could be contacted by mortgage servicers for additional information at the direction of the independent consultant.

Requests for review had to be postmarked or submitted online by December 31, 2012.

=== Interim report ===
On June 21, 2012, the OCC released its second interim report on the status of the Independent Foreclosure Review and actions required by consent orders issued in April 2011 to correct deficient mortgage servicing and foreclosure processes.

=== Agencies publish financial remediation framework ===
On June 21, 2012, the Office of the Comptroller of the Currency and the Board of Governors of the Federal Reserve System released a financial remediation framework Agencies release financial remediation guidance, extend deadline for requesting a free independent foreclosure review to September 30, 2012 that provided examples of errors in foreclosures covered by the regulators' consent orders that require compensation or other remediation as directed in the regulators' April 2011 orders. The consultants use the framework to recommend remediation for financial injury identified during the Independent Foreclosure Review. The servicers prepare remediation plans based on the consultants' recommendations. The federal banking regulators had to approve each servicer's remediation plan. The framework helped ensure that similarly situated borrowers receive similar treatment.

=== Replacement Programme 2013 ===
On February 28, 2013, the OCC and the Federal Reserve announced a replacement program for 13 banks and servicers, while 3 of the original banks decided to keep the Independent Foreclosure Review Process. The replacement program includes US$3.6 billion in direct cash payments to homeowners and $5.7 billion in loss mitigation assistance intended to keep people in their homes.

On April 13, 2011, the Office of the Comptroller of the Currency, the Board of Governors of the Federal Reserve System, and the Office of Thrift Supervision announced enforcement actions against 14 large residential mortgage servicers and two third-party vendors for unsafe and unsound practices related to residential mortgage servicing and foreclosure processing; customers of 27 mortgage servicers (listed below) may be eligible for compensation.

== Eligibility for review ==
To be eligible, the mortgage must have been active in the foreclosure process between January 1, 2009, and December 31, 2010, the property securing the loan must have been the primary residence, and the mortgage must have been serviced by one of the following mortgage servicers:

- America's Servicing Company
- Aurora Loan Services
- BAC Home Loans Servicing
- Bank of America
- Beneficial Finance
- Chase
- Citibank
- CitiFinancial
- CitiMortgage
- Countrywide
- EMC Mortgage Corporation
- EverBank/EverHome Mortgage Company
- Financial Freedom
- GMAC Mortgage
- HFC
- HSBC
- IndyMac Mortgage Services
- MetLife Bank
- National City Mortgage
- PNC Mortgage
- Sovereign Bank
- SunTrust Mortgage
- U.S. Bank
- Wachovia Mortgage
- Washington Mutual (WaMu)
- Wells Fargo Bank, N.A.
- Wilshire Credit Corporation

Note: Both Litton Loan Servicing (owned by Goldman Sachs) and Saxon Mortgage (owned by Morgan Stanley) also signed consent orders with regulators.

== Engagement letters ==
The OCC also released engagement letters that describe how the independent consultants, retained by the servicers, will conduct their file reviews and claims processes to identify borrowers who suffered financial injury as a result of deficiencies identified in the OCC's consent orders.

== Allegations of impropriety ==
There have been allegations that the banks themselves have a heavy hand in the review process. News sources, which are citing e-mails, employee interviews and contracts, suggested that the biggest offenders—Bank of America, Wells Fargo, Citigroup and JPMorgan Chase—appeared to be conducting much of the review work themselves, compromising the independence of the review.

Yves Smith, in her financial blog Naked Capitalism, wrote a thorough analysis of the Independent Foreclosure Review, interviewing several former reviewers on the practices used both by Bank of America, and its review contractor Promontory Financial Group.

Her findings showed, in her words:

1. After extensive debriefing of Bank of America whistleblowers, we found overwhelming evidence that the bank engaged in certain abuses frequently, in some cases pervasively, in its servicing of delinquent mortgages.
2. This settlement, as intended, was yet another significant bailout to predatory servicers.
3. As we will demonstrate in later posts in this series, even making the most generous interpretation possible of the role played by Promontory, Promontory's review at Bank of America completely omitted significant categories of borrower harm that were explicitly discussed both in the OCC consent order and Promontory's engagement letter with Bank of America.
4. The organizational design, the way the reviewers were managed, the elimination of areas of inquiry, and evidence of records tampering with Bank of America records all point to a multifaceted, if not necessarily well orchestrated, program to make sure as much damaging information as possible was not considered or minimized.

== Payment structure ==
The payment structure can be found on the Federal Reserve site
