= Home Equity Theft Prevention Act =

The Home Equity Theft Prevention Act (HETPA, NY RPL §265-a) is a New York State law passed on July 26, 2006, to provide homeowners of residential property with information and disclosures in order to make informed decisions when approached by persons seeking a sale or transfer of the homeowner's property, particularly when homeowners are in default on their mortgage payments or the property is in foreclosure.

== Covered contract ==
A contract is covered if it is either (i) currently in foreclosure or on a tax lien sale list; or (ii) the owner is in default (behind on mortgage payments by 2+ months) and the sale involves a reconveyance agreement.

A reconveyance arrangement has two elements: (i) A sale, mortgage, lien, encumbrance or any other method which allows an "equity purchaser" to obtain legal or equitable title to all or part of the property; and (ii) Some agreement or promise to the "equity seller" that he/she can regain ownership of the property (e.g., the purchase agreement, option to purchase, lease, etc.)

There are some key requirements for a valid reconveyance agreement. The equity purchaser needs the equity seller's permission to resell the property to anyone else for so long as the equity seller has a right to buy the property back.

Either (i) title to the property must eventually be reconveyed to the equity seller; or (ii) the equity purchaser must have paid seller at least 82% of the fair market value of the property within 120 days of the eviction or voluntary relinquishment by the equity seller.

The equity purchaser must confirm that the equity seller has the "reasonable ability" to buy back the property and the deed must recite that the property is subject to reconveyance and the terms of the reconveyance arrangement.

== Contractual requirements ==
Once a contract is determined to be covered by the Act, there are some strict contractual requirements that must be met:

The contract must contain the entire agreement between the parties and must meet the following format requirements: Contract must be fully completed (i.e., no blank spaces); Font size equal to at least 12-point bold type; In English or in both English or Spanish if Spanish is the primary language of the equity seller; Name, address and phone number of the buyer; Address of the subject property; Consideration to be paid; List of all services that buyer has promised; Terms for payment of the consideration; Time at which possession of the property must be surrendered; Terms of any rental or lease agreement; Terms of any reconveyance agreement; Notice of right to cancellation in the immediate proximity of signature line and font in at least 14-point bold type (form in HEPTA); and Notice of cancellation form to be attached to the contract (form in HEPTA)

Any provision which purports to limit the liability of the equity purchaser shall be null and void. Inclusion of such a provision shall, at the option of the equity seller, render the covered contract void. Any provision which purports to require arbitration shall be void at the option of the equity seller. Any waiver of any or all HEPTA shall be void and unenforceable as contrary to the public policy.

== Five-day right of recission ==
The act also gives the equity seller a five-day right to cancel the contract; a "cooling off" period. Once an equity seller cancels the contract by sending the cancellation form or otherwise indicating such an intention, the equity purchaser must return all original contracts and other documents signed by the equity seller within 10 days, as well as any fee or other consideration received by the equity purchaser from the equity seller. Cancellation of the contract releases the equity seller of all obligations to pay fees to the equity purchaser.

== Prohibited behavior ==
Before midnight on the 5th business day after the contract is executed, the equity purchaser cannot: Accept a deed; Record any document with the county clerk; Transfer any interest in the residence; Pay the equity seller any consideration; Suggest that the equity seller waive his/her right to cancel or rescind.

The equity purchaser is prohibited from representing (directly or indirectly) that: Equity purchaser is an advisor or acting on behalf of the equity seller; Equity purchaser has certification that buyer actually does not have or that buyer is not a member of a licensed profession when he actually is a member of that profession; Equity purchaser is helping the equity seller "save" the residence, unless equity purchaser has a good faith basis for such representation; or Equity purchaser is helping the equity seller in preventing a foreclosure unless the equity purchaser has a good faith basis for such representation

An equity purchaser shall make no false or misleading statement regarding: The value of the property; The amount of proceeds the equity seller will receive after a foreclosure sale; The timing of the judicial foreclosure process; Any contract term The equity seller's rights and obligations; The nature of any document which the equity purchaser induces the equity seller to sign; Any other false or misleading statement concerning the sale of the property or concerning a reconveyance arrangement

The equity purchaser is prohibited from making any contract that takes unconscionable advantage of the equitable seller.

== Remedies ==
2-Year Right of Rescission - Generally, a violation of the contractual requirements or any of the prohibited acts in Subdivision 7 makes the conveyance voidable and may be rescinded within 2 years of the date the deed was recorded. The statute then gives the equity purchaser (or its successor) twenty days to reconvey the property on the condition of repayment of any consideration paid to the equity seller. HEPTA does not affect the rights of a bona-fide purchaser or encumbrancer for value if their conveyance occurred before the recording of the notice of rescission.

6-Year Statute of Limitations - Within 6 years, an equity seller may bring an action for the recovery of damages or equitable relief against an equity purchaser for a violation of HEPTA. A court may award actual damages plus reasonable attorneys' fees and costs. The court is also authorized to award equitable relief of up to 3 times the actual damages.

There are also criminal penalties for violation of prohibited behavior listed in Subdivision 7:

Violation "with intent to defraud" = class E felony, subject to imprisonment and a fine of not more than $25,000. "Knowingly violates" = Class A misdemeanor, subject to a fine of not more than $25,000 and imprisonment in accordance with the penal law, or both.

A mortgage broker or bank making a loan with knowledge that the equity purchaser is not complying with HEPTA is subject to penalties under Banking Law §595-a. These criminal penalties are in addition to the risk that the equity seller will rescind and thereby jeopardize the encumbrancer's interest in the property.

== Exclusions ==
Those who acquire title as follows are excluded from HETPA:

(i) To use, and then actually uses, the property as his/her primary residence;

(ii) By a deed from a referee in a foreclosure sale;

(iii) At any sale of property authorized by statute;

(iv) By order or judgment of any court;

(v) From a spouse, or from a parent, grandparent, child, grandchild or sibling of such person or such person's spouse;

(vi) As a not-for-profit housing organization or as a public housing agency; or

(vii) As a bona fide purchaser or encumbrancer for value (e.g. a lienholder)

What is a Bona Fide Purchaser? One who (i) acts in good faith; (ii) purchases for valuable consideration or provide a mortgage; (iii) has no notice of the equity seller's continuing right to, or equity in, the property prior to the acquisition of title or encumbrance; (iv) has no notice of any violation of HETPA by the equity purchaser as related to the property. Generally, this is one who either purchases from or provides a loan to the equity purchaser.

An equity purchaser has a defense to a violation of Subdivision 7 if he/she (i) acted in good faith; (ii) proves that the violation was not intentional (iii) proves that the violation resulted from a bona fide error despite procedures adapted to avoid such errors; (iv) notifies the equity seller within ninety days of the contract date of the compliance failure; Makes appropriate restitution within ninety days of the contract date.

Examples of bona fide errors include clerical, calculation, computer malfunction and programming, and printing errors. An error of legal judgment is NOT a bona fide error, nor is a failure to provide notices or other material information.

== Impact on deeds in lieu of foreclosure ==
There is some confusion as to whether HEPTA applies to deeds in lieu of foreclosure since there is no clear exclusion as there is for referee deeds, for example. The 2-year right of rescission is not a risk that banks or title insurers are comfortable with, especially given the complexities of compliance, so many banks and title insurers are not willing to work with deeds in lieu.
