= Remortgage =

Repaying a mortgage by taking out a new one

A remortgage (known as refinancing in the United States) is the process of paying off one mortgage with the proceeds from a new mortgage using the same property as security. The term is mainly used commercially in the United Kingdom, though what it describes is not unique to any one country. Often the purpose of switching is to secure a more favorable interest rate from a different lender.

The process of remortgaging does not usually involve moving house or taking out a second mortgage on the property; it is in effect the transfer of a mortgage from one lender to another. Homeowners may choose to remortgage for various reasons, usually to reduce the overall monthly mortgage payment amounts. However, other reasons may include to reduce the size of repayments, to pay off a mortgage earlier, to raise capital, or to consolidate other more expensive short-term debts.

Home buyers often misuse the expression remortgage when they are simply switching from one product to another with the same lender; this is not a remortgage which involves the removal of one legal charge over a property and its substitution with another in favour of a new lender.

The ability to remortgage is very much based on an individual's circumstances and as the costs involved can be very large, there may be prepayment penalties and other costs. People who remortgage are often advised to take advice from a suitably qualified individual.

In the United Kingdom the majority of remortgage rates track the Bank of England base rate. The current base rate stands at 5.25%. The base rate was set at an historical low of 0.1% in March 2020. Due to these record low rates many people with an existing mortgage were able to remortgage their home from a higher rate onto a lower rate which could result in a saving on their monthly mortgage repayments.
