= Foreclosure rescue =

Foreclosure rescue in the United States is where a mortgage that is in arrears and where the lender is at the stage of foreclosing on the loan agrees to stop the foreclosure in exchange for funds received through loan modification or from a government grant. It may also refer to funds that allow the homeowner to repurchase the property at or after foreclosure.

Legitimate foreclosure rescue can give the homeowner a realistic opportunity to regain their ability to get out of the situation and make regular timely payments again. However the fact that homeowners are often desperate at this stage has meant that foreclosure rescue has been the target for a scam known as the foreclosure rescue scheme. Homeowners have been advised to confirm any scheme is legitimate before they engage in foreclosure rescue.

Foreclosure rescue came to prominence in 2007 as a result of the US subprime mortgage crisis which cause large numbers of mortgages to go into default. In response the US government unveiled a plan to provide foreclosure rescue to homeowners in 2009.

== History ==
In 2009, President Barack Obama unveiled a plan to provide foreclosure rescue to homeowners. This included the ability to modify loans, lower interest rates, and help homeowners before they defaulted.

== Checklist for legitimate foreclosure rescue ==
Key signs of legitimate foreclosure rescue include:

- No costs or fees until all services are rendered
  - Home is saved *and* principal is reduced or modified
- No guarantee of saving home
- Recommends continuing communication with lender
- No false affiliation claims
  - Only United States Department of Housing and Urban Development (HUD) approved non-profits can claim government affiliation
- Clear, written contracts
- Doesn't offer to accept your mortgage payment for your lender

== See also ==
- Occupy Homes
