= Refinancing burnout =

Tendency for prepayments to drop after rates fall, rise, and fall again

In mortgages, refinancing burnout is the tendency for prepayments to drop after rates fall, rise, and fall again. In other words, when interest rates keep on dropping, those who can benefit by taking advantages of refinancing will have done so already when rates declined in previous periods and this prepayment behavior is called refinancing burnout.
