= Occupy Homes =

Housing activist movement in 2010s United States

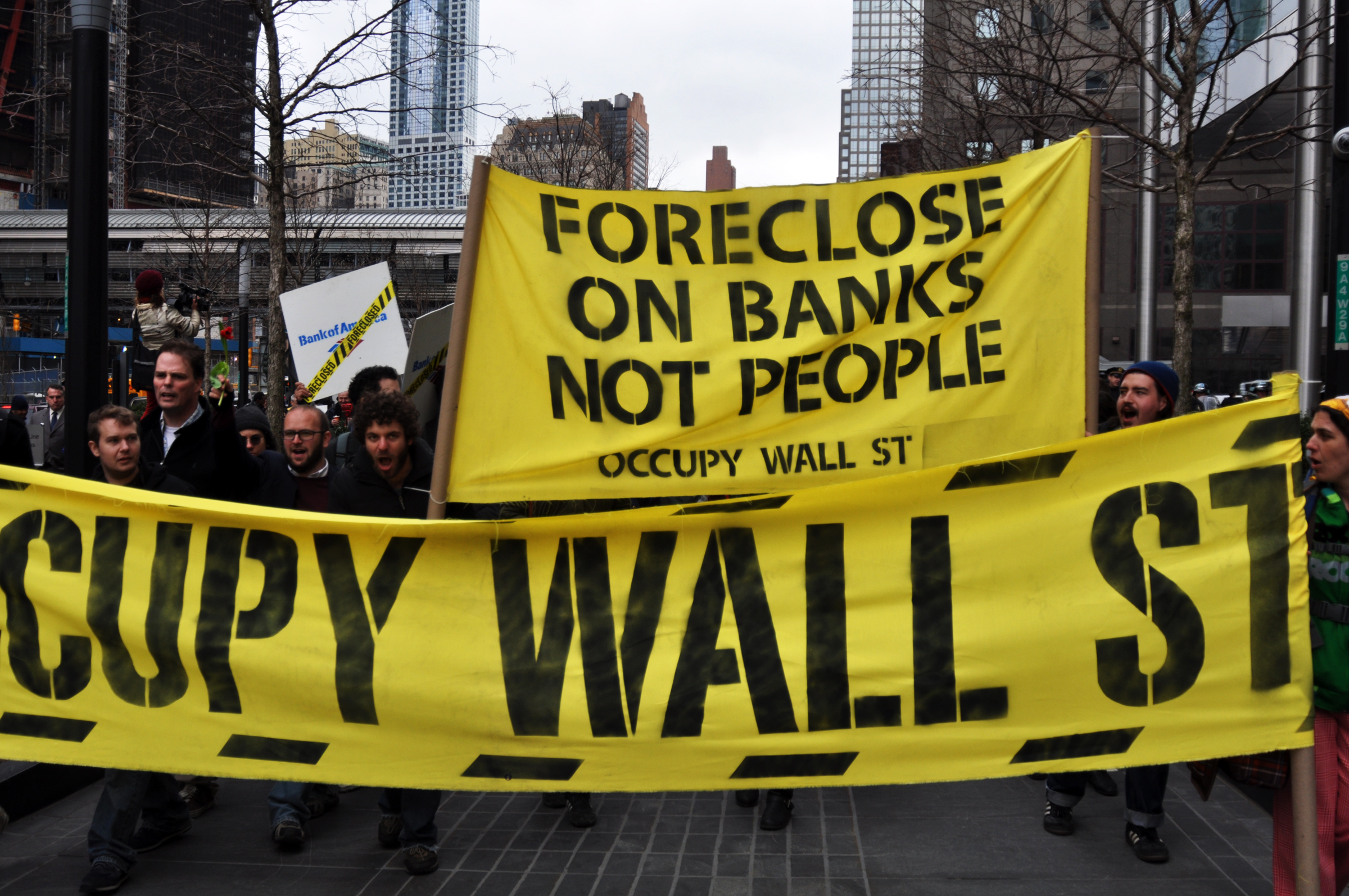
Marchers hold a banner reading "Foreclose On Banks Not People"

Occupy Homes or Occupy Our Homes is part of the Occupy movement which attempts to prevent the foreclosure of people's homes. Protesters delay foreclosures by camping out on the foreclosed property. They also stage protests at the banks responsible for the ongoing foreclosure crisis, sometimes blocking their entrances. It has been compared to the direct action taken by people to prevent home foreclosures during the Great Depression in the United States.

== History ==
The 2008 financial crisis resulted in the collapse of some large financial institutions, the bailout of banks by national governments, and downturns in stock markets around the world. In many areas, the housing market also suffered, resulting in numerous evictions and foreclosures; in the U.S., 3.6 million homes have been foreclosed since August 2007. In 2008, a federal law termed the Troubled Asset Relief Program (TARP) was passed to spend 700 billion dollars to bail out banks. The law also specifically called for the government to encourage banks to modify loans to prevent foreclosures. However, very little money has actually been used to bail out home owners and the banks have done little to change their lending practices to help people to avoid losing their homes.

The Occupy Homes movement has its roots in the early 1970s, when declining working-class incomes and a lack of bank financing for low-rent properties left thousands of New York City buildings abandoned and hundreds of former tenants squatted vacant buildings on Manhattan's Upper West Side, East Harlem, Chelsea, Chinatown, the Lower East Side, and the Williamsburg section of Brooklyn. A similar group based in Miami, Florida, Take Back the Land, has been working to block evictions, and rehousing homeless people in foreclosed houses since 2007. Early successful actions included the delay of an eviction of a woman in Ohio when protesters camped out in her yard, convincing Fannie Mae to hold off on an eviction by holding a vigil outside a home in California, delaying a foreclosure in Minnesota so that an occupant could first move out of a home, and convincing a New York landlord to provide adequate heating to tenants by occupying a boiler room.

== National Day of Action ==
On December 6, 2011, Occupy Our Homes, an offshoot of Occupy Wall Street, said it was embarking on a "National Day of Action" to protest the mistreatment of homeowners by big banks, who they say made billions of dollars off of the housing bubble by offering predatory loans and indulging in practices that took advantage of consumers. In more than two dozen cities across the nation the movement took on the housing crisis by re-occupying foreclosed homes, disrupting bank auctions and blocking evictions.

Saying, "The banks got bailed out, but our families are getting kicked out", Occupy Wall Street joined in solidarity with a Brooklyn community to occupy homes that were foreclosed and are now owned by banks. A peaceful group of more than 500 staged what it termed "a National Day of Action" to fight fraudulent lending practices and "illegal evictions by banks" — the institutions Occupiers blame for the nation's economic predicament. Occupy Wall Street said there would be similar occupations in other communities and that they also will try to disrupt auctions at which foreclosed properties are sold. There were also similar occupations in Atlanta, San Francisco and Portland, Oregon.

In Minneapolis, a nonprofit group, Minnesota's Neighborhoods Organizing for Change, has joined with Occupy Minneapolis protesters to live on the properties of two foreclosed homeowners. On December 6, about 50 people began occupying the home of an unemployed man who faces eviction after several heart attacks and shoulder surgery that prevented him from working at his former job as an independent contractor. A spokesperson for Neighborhoods Organizing for Change said, "Foreclosure in his case made no sense. His mortgage balance was $275,000 but the auction of his home only fetched $80,000, less than one-third of the amount he owed. Everybody, including the bank, would have been better off reducing his balance to an affordable level."

In Atlanta, Occupy Our Homes activists went to the courthouses in three of the area's largest counties to disrupt the foreclosure auctions happening there. The group is demanding an immediate moratorium on all foreclosures. In Chicago, activists took over homes left vacant due to foreclosures. They moved a homeless mother and child, an evicted homeowner and a college student into one of the houses which had been abandoned by its owner in April and was severely vandalized.

Calling the December 6 demonstrations and actions just a "warm-up" for actions of the next few months, Max Rameau, a housing activist with Take Back the Land, one of the organizations that has aligned itself with the Occupy Our Homes movement, said, "This is an important practice round for our 2012 spring offensive".

== Continuing actions ==
On December 6, 2011, members of Occupy Atlanta began an occupation of the home of Brigitte Walker, a former Army Staff Sergeant who was medically discharged in 2007. Unable to keep up with payments on her reduced salary, her home was scheduled to be auctioned off on January 3. At a press conference on December 20, it was announced by members of Occupy Atlanta and State Senator Vincent Fort, who Walker had contacted for aid, that they had successfully renegotiated her loan to a monthly payment she could afford that would allow her to stay in her home. By late December hundreds of other foreclosure victims were being defended by local branches of the Occupy movement.

== Reaction ==
Conservative commentator Andrew Breitbart said the movement's new focus is "fomenting civil unrest, fomenting class warfare" and that this action shows that Occupy Wall Street is not "an authentic grass-roots movement but a political maneuver backed by organized labor and remnants of the ACORN community-organizing group aimed at boosting President Obama's re-election campaign".

Speaking on CNN, law professors Sonia Katyal and Eduardo Peñalver compared the occupation of foreclosed homes to earlier social protests that brought about positive legal change. In their opinion, the Occupy Homes movement demonstrates an obvious connection between the Occupy Wall Street protestor's disobedience (the occupation of parks and streets) and their complaints of economic inequality, political corruption and the excessive power of banks. They point out that the financial institutions that brought about the current recession, often using illegal procedures such as robo-signing, now own the very homes that were lost due to their illegal practices and they believe that Occupy Homes forms a tighter link between its acts of occupation and its political objections.

New York writer, filmmaker, and Occupier Astra Taylor wrote:

Not only does the occupation of abandoned foreclosed homes connect the dots between Wall Street and Main Street, it can also lead to swift and tangible victories, something movements desperately need for momentum to be maintained. The banks, it seems, are softer targets than one might expect because so many cases are rife with legal irregularities and outright criminality. With one in five homes facing foreclosure and filings showing no sign of slowing down in the next few years, the number of people touched by the mortgage crisis—whether because they have lost their homes or because their homes are now underwater—truly boggles the mind.

== See also ==
- Occupy movement
- 2010 United States foreclosure crisis
- Foreclosure rescue
- Mortgage discrimination
- Penny auction (foreclosure)
- Subprime mortgage crisis
- Take Back the Land
