= Refunding =

Economic practice

Refunding occurs when an entity that has issued callable bonds calls those debt securities from the debt holders with the express purpose of reissuing new debt at a lower coupon rate. In essence, the issue of new, lower-interest debt allows the company to prematurely refund the older, higher-interest debt.

On the contrary, non-refundable bonds may be callable but they cannot be re-issued with a lower coupon rate—they cannot be refunded.

== See also ==
- Refinancing
