= Foreclosure rescue scheme =

Home foreclosure scam

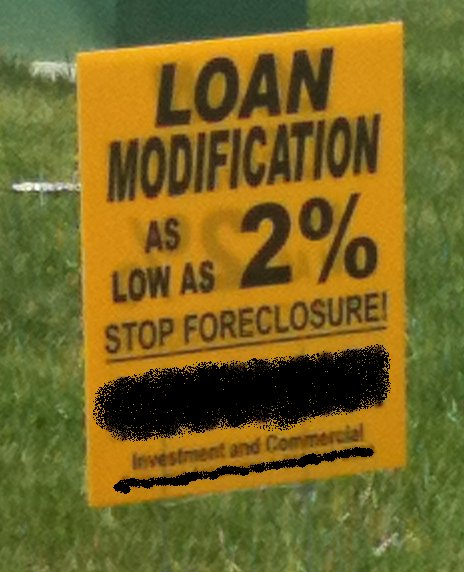
A sign along the road advertising foreclosure rescue

A foreclosure rescue scheme is a scam that targets those whose house is facing potential foreclosure. The scheme preys on desperate homeowners whose mortgages are in default by offering to prevent foreclosure. There are various ways in which foreclosure rescue schemes work, causing different types of harm to the homeowners, but all ultimately with the likely end result of the owner being forced out of their home and losing even more money.

Foreclosure rescue schemes are typically advertised in a variety of informal settings, such as roadside signs.

== Types of foreclosure rescue schemes ==
There are several ways foreclosure rescue schemes operate:

=== Lease-buyback ===
In a lease-buyback scheme, the owner turns the lease over with an option to buy it back later. The owner is promised to be able to rent the property back, which will be counted toward an eventual buyback. These can be legitimate; however, in a scam they may end in the loss of the property or considerable additional cost: the renting prices may be made so high that the original owner cannot afford to continue paying and/or the buyback price may be set far above the fair market value of the property.

=== Equity stripping ===
Equity stripping or equity skimming is a variation on lease-buyback and is one of the most common types of foreclosure rescue schemes. In it, the perpetrator assumes ownership of the house while allowing the former owner to continue living there, provided that s/he pays rent to the perpetrator, who is the new owner. The perpetrator often claims this ownership is temporary, and the victim will later reassume ownership of the home once the terms of the loan are renegotiated. But after taking over the deed to the house, the perpetrator cashes out all the equity in the home. The perpetrator also collects money from the victim by charging rent to the victim for living in the house while not owning it.

The final result is eviction from the house with zero equity paired with greater financial loss to the victim. The perpetrator, who then has ownership of the home, will either sell the property or allow it to go into foreclosure.

=== Consulting service ===
A firm may offer to act as an agent to renegotiate the terms of a loan with the lender, in return for a fee. The firms are unlikely to have any better negotiation power so the value of the fee may be disproportionate to the service received, the firm may be unable to negotiate any better terms or in the worst cases may not contact the lender. Firms may also encourage the original borrower to avoid any contact with the lender, under the guise that such contact would interfere with their efforts to secure a modification, when in fact it might reveal that the firm has not contacted the lender at all.

When negotiation does take place the firm may put in place a deal to buy the property from the lender, if the equity value of the property has reduced, then this may be at a lower price than the current outstanding debt. Lenders may accept this to guarantee payment now, rather than gamble on future values, ability of the owner to pay etc. In these cases the situation can be similar to the other schemes with the original owner being offered the option to rent the property with a future buy back. As for the other schemes in a scam situation the terms of any tenancy or buy back may also be set to the gross disadvantage of the original owner.

== See also ==
- Foreclosure rescue
- Mortgage fraud
- Mortgage elimination
