= Hardest Hit Fund =

- Founded: February 1, 2010
- Founder: United States Treasury
- Type: Housing charity
- Location: Washington, D.C.

The United States Treasury established the Hardest Hit Fund in February 2010, to provide targeted aid to states hit hardest by the subprime mortgage crisis which began in 2007. Each state housing agency gathered public input to implement programs designed to meet the distinct challenges struggling homeowners in their state were facing. HHF is part of the Troubled Asset Relief Program.

== Program description ==
States were chosen based on two categories, their unemployment rates need to be at or above the national average or steep home price declines greater than 20 percent, since the housing market downturn. The means of funds distribution varies by state, and homeowners must contact their state housing finance agencies to apply for aid. A total of $7.6 billion (~$10.9 billion in 2025) were allocated to the 18 states and the District of Columbia in 2010.

As of December 31, 2011, only 3% of the funds had been spent according to a government report.

In 2016, another $2 billion was allocated to HHF by the Consolidated Appropriations Act, which is available to states until 2020.

== Criticism ==
According to a May 2012 report, Fox Business stated that programs like the Hardest Hit Fund and HAMP modifications are helping only a few homeowners and have not been effective at dealing with the mortgage crisis.
