= Loan modification in the United States =

Loan modification is the systematic alteration of mortgage loan agreements that help those having problems making the payments by reducing interest rates, monthly payments or principal balances. Lending institutions could make one or more of these changes to relieve financial pressure on borrowers to prevent the condition of foreclosure. Loan modifications have been practiced in the United States since the 1930s. During the Great Depression, loan modification programs took place at the state level in an effort to reduce levels of loan foreclosures.

During the Subprime mortgage crisis, loan modification became a matter of national policy, with various actions taken to alter mortgage loan terms to prevent further economic destabilization.

== United States 1930s ==
During the Great Depression in the United States a number of mortgage modification programs were enacted by the states to limit foreclosure sales and subsequent homelessness and its economic impact. Because of the shrinkage of the economy, many borrowers lost their jobs and income and were unable to maintain their mortgage payments. In 1933, the Minnesota Mortgage Moratorium Act was challenged by a bank which argued before the United States Supreme Court that it was a violation of the Contract Clause of the Constitution. In Home Building & Loan Association v. Blaisdell, the court upheld the law imposing a mandatory mortgage modification.

== United States 2000s ==
According to the Federal Deposit Insurance Corporation (FDIC) chairman, Sheila C. Bair, looking back as far as the 1980s, "the FDIC applied workout procedures for troubled loans out of bank failures, modifying loans to make them affordable and to turn nonperforming into performing loans by offering refinances, loan assumptions, and family loan transfers."

The U.S. housing boom of the first few years of the 21st century ended abruptly in 2006. Housing starts, which peaked at more than 2 million units in 2005, plummeted to just over half that level. Home prices, which were increasing at double-digit rates nationally in 2004 and 2005, have fallen dramatically since (see Chart 1). As home prices decline, the number of problem mortgages, particularly in sub-prime and Alt-A portfolios, is rising. As of third quarter 2007, the percentage of sub-prime adjustable-rate mortgages (ARMs) that were seriously delinquent or in foreclosure reached 15.6 percent, more than double the level of a year ago (see Chart 2). The deterioration in credit performance began in the industrial Midwest, where economic conditions have been the weakest, but has now (2006–2007) spread to the former boom markets of Florida, California, and other coastal states.

Chart 1

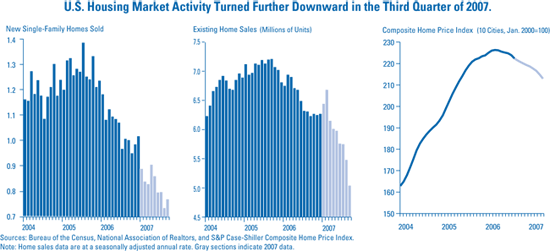

Chart 2

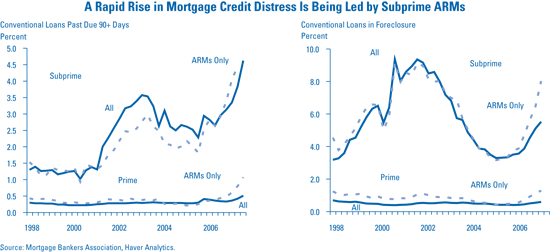

During 2007, investors and ratings agencies have repeatedly downgraded assumptions about sub-prime credit performance. A Merrill Lynch study published in July estimated that if U.S. home prices fell only 5 percent, subprime credit losses to investors would total just under $150 billion, and Alt-A credit losses would total $25 billion. On the heels of this report came news that the S&P/Case-Shiller Composite Home Price Index for 10 large U.S. cities had fallen in August to a level that was already 5 percent lower than a year ago, with the likelihood of a similar decline over the coming year.

The complexity of many mortgage-backed securitization structures has heightened the overall risk aversion of investors, resulting in what has become a broader illiquidity in global credit markets. These disruptions have led to a precipitous decline in sub-prime lending, a significant reduction in the availability of Alt-A loans, and higher interest rates on jumbo loans (see Chart 3). The tightening in mortgage credit has placed further downward pressure on home sales and home prices, a situation that now could derail the U.S. economic expansion.

Chart 3

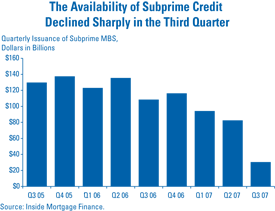

Residential mortgage credit quality continues to weaken, with both delinquencies and charge-offs on the rise at FDIC-insured institutions.

This trend, in tandem with upward pricing of hybrid adjustable-rate mortgage (ARM) loans, falling home prices, and fewer refinancing options, underscores the urgency of finding a workable solution to current problems in the sub-prime mortgage market. Legislators, regulators, bankers, mortgage servicers, and consumer groups have been debating the merits of strategies that may help preserve home ownership, minimize foreclosures, and restore some stability to local housing markets.

On December 6, 2007, an industry-led plan was announced to help avert foreclosure for certain sub-prime homeowners who face unaffordable payments when their interest rates reset. This plan provides for a streamlined process to extend the starter rates on sub-prime ARMs for at least five years in cases where borrowers remain current on their loans but cannot refinance or afford the higher payments after reset. An important component of the industry-led plan is detailed reporting of loan modification activity. Working with the United States Treasury Department and other bank regulators, the FDIC will monitor loan modification levels and seek adjustments to the protocols if warranted.

== Loss Mitigation Mediation (LMM) Program ==
Mediation is usually a great way for a plaintiff and defendant to sit down with a neutral arbiter to hash out their differences and come to a resolution that is usually better than continued litigation. Mediation is successful in all types of disputes including personal injury cases, contract disputes and even divorces. However, in these cases, circuit court judges will readily punish a party who fails to attend mediation or who attends but fails to comply with the mediation order.

In 2009, the Florida Supreme Court forced every Florida Circuit Court (the courts in which Foreclosure Lawsuits are heard), to implement a mediation program for homeowners facing Foreclosure. This program was called the “Residential Mortgage Foreclosure Mediation” (RMFM) Program. The idea was for lenders to provide an in-person or telephonic meeting with the Homeowner/Defendant in the presence of an impartial mediator to discuss the Foreclosure Lawsuit and possible alternatives (including Loan Modification, Deed in Lieu of Foreclosure, and Short Sale).

The RMFM Program was cancelled in 2011 following widespread criticism of the program. The RMFM failed because it had no teeth, because judges were reluctant to punish the mortgage companies for failing to mediate in good faith, and because borrowers were not receiving the cooperation they needed from the banks. In short, the RMFM was a complete waste of time, not because mediation is a bad idea but because of the limited loss mitigation options and because most state court judges could not or would not enforce the program.

In 2012, the Bankruptcy Court in the Middle District of Florida implemented its own version of the failed RMFM, but unlike the state court version, it has seen a much higher success rate. One Orlando bankruptcy attorney reported a 90% success rate, with 18% of his modifications involving principal reduction. Similar programs have also been instituted by Bankruptcy courts in New York and Rhode Island.

Following the lead of the Middle District, the Southern District of Florida Bankruptcy Court has initiated its own loss mitigation mediation (“LMM”) program. The LMM Program kicked off on April 1, 2013 and unlike the Middle District, the Southern District's program has more requirements for all parties and includes debtors in all chapters, not just Chapter 13. Chapter 7 debtors may use LMM to request a surrender of the property (a real surrender that provides for a transfer of title). LMM may be used by Chapter 13 debtors to request and apply for modification through mediation or surrender of any property they no longer want to own.

The Southern District's program also includes the utilization of a document processing program called the DMM Portal. Participants in the LMM program will use this secure online portal for the exchange of documents and communication. This program will help ensure that documents sent between the lender and the borrower and not lost or misplaced. Instant uploads and verification of transmissions are a hallmark of the portal.

Election to participate in the LMM program will suspend any pending motions for relief from stay (“MFR”). However, while an LMM is pending, debtors will be required to pay 31% of their gross monthly income through the Chapter 13 plan as an “adequate protection” payment. The fees a debtor will have to pay to participate in the program will typically include an $1,800 fee to their bankruptcy attorney for handling the modification through their Chapter 13 plan and an approximately $300 fee to the mediator.

While the bankruptcy mediation program does not guarantee a residential loan modification, it does make it much harder for a mortgage servicer to reject a modification because of the stringent requirement to act in good faith. For instance, if a servicer rejects a HAMP application, it will have to explain why. Often, a rejection is based upon a miscalculation, a misinterpretation, or an oversight. In this program, the debtor's attorney can demand that the servicer's representative explain his calculations. Often, the mistakes are found and corrected, resulting in the modification being accepted.

While mortgage modification and bankruptcy may not be the solution to all distressed mortgage problems, it will certainly provide an additional venue for homeowners in need. Applying for a modification through bankruptcy may provide relief from the dischargeable debts that are keeping the debtor from being able to make the mortgage payments and provide the lenders a guarantee that the borrower is no longer obligated by those burdens.

== Streamlined modification process ==
The adoption of this streamlined modification framework is an additional tool that servicers will now have to help avoid preventable foreclosures. This framework will not only help homeowners who receive a streamlined modification, but will also further address servicer capacity concerns by freeing up resources, helping ensure that borrowers do not fall through the cracks because servicers aren't able to get to them.

This is the first time the industry has agreed on an industry standard. The benchmark ratio for calculating the affordable payment is 38 percent of monthly gross household income. Once the affordable payment is determined, there are several steps the servicer can take to create that payment – extending the term, reducing the interest rate, and forbearing interest. In the event that the affordable payment is still beyond the borrower's means, the borrower's situation will be reviewed on a case-by-case basis using a cash flow budget. This program resulted from a unified effort among the Enterprises, Hope Now and its 27 servicer partners, Treasury, the Federal Housing Administration (FHA) and Federal Housing Finance Agency (FHFA). In addition, we’ve drawn on the FDIC's experience and assistance from developing the IndyMac streamlined approach and have greatly benefited from the FDIC's input and example. To accommodate the need for more flexibility among a larger number of servicers, the Streamlined Modification Program does differ from the IndyMac model in a few areas. However, it uses the same fundamental tools to achieve the same affordability target.

The Streamlined Modification Program (SMP) was developed in collaboration with the FHFA, the Department of Treasury, Freddie Mac, and members of the HOPE NOW Alliance.

=== SMP eligibility criteria ===
The SMP eligibility criteria include:

1. Conforming conventional or jumbo conforming mortgage loans originated on or before January 1, 2008;
2. At least three payments past due;
3. The loan is secured by a one-unit property that is the borrower's primary residence;
4. Current mark-to-market loan to value (LTV) of 90 percent or more; and
5. Property is not abandoned, vacant, condemned, or in a serious state of disrepair.
6. SMP is designed to reduce distressed borrowers' monthly mortgage payments to an amount equal to 38 percent of their monthly gross income. To do so, servicers may, in the following order:
7. Capitalize accrued interest, escrow advances and costs, if allowed by state law;
8. Extend the term of the mortgage loan by up to 480 months;
9. Reduce the mortgage loan interest rate in increments of .125% to a fixed rate that is not less than 3% (if this exercise results in a below market rate, it will, after 5 years, step up in annual increments to a market rate);
10. As a last resort, provide for principal forbearance, which will result in a balloon payment fully due and payable upon borrower's sale of the property or payoff or maturity of the loan.

Borrowers meeting the SMP eligibility requirements enter into a trial period in which they must make monthly loan payments equal to the proposed modified payment. Timely payments must be made for three consecutive months before a borrower's loan can be modified under the SMP.

The "Streamlined Modification Plan," or SMP, which is an expansion of what many lenders are already doing, was implemented starting December 15, 2008.

== IndyMAC plan ==
With the George W. Bush administration refusing to enact FDIC Chairwoman Sheila Bair's controversial loan modification plan, lawmakers are taking matters into their own hands.

- Offer proactive workout solutions designed to address borrowers who have the willingness but limited capacity to pay.
1. Return the loan to a current status.
2. Capitalize delinquent interest and escrow.
3. Modify the loan terms based on waterfalls, starting at a front-end 38 percent HTI ratio down to a 31 percent HTI ratio subject to a formal net present value (NPV) floor.
4. Reduce interest rate to as low as 3 percent.
5. Extend, if necessary, the amortization and/or term of the loan to 40 years.
6. Forbear principal if necessary.
- Provide borrowers the opportunity to stay in their home while making an affordable payment for the life of the loan.
1. Require the borrower to make one payment at the time of the modification.
2. Cap the interest rate at the Freddie Mac Weekly Survey rate effective as required to meet the target HTI ratio, fixing the adjusted rate and monthly payment amount for 5 years.
3. Step up the initial interest rate gradually starting in year 6 by increasing it one percentage point each year until reaching the Freddie Mac Weekly Survey rate cap.
- Use a financial model with supportable assumptions to ensure investor interests are protected.
1. Input borrower specific income information into the NPV Tool, which provides a real-time workout solution.
2. Perform automated loan level underwriting across large segments of the portfolio to support pre-approved bulk mailings.
3. Verify income information the borrower provided via check stubs, tax returns, and/or bank statements.
4. Compare the cost of foreclosure to mitigate losses.
5. Mandate that the cost of the modification must be less than the estimated foreclosure loss.
- Borrower eligibility
1. The loan is at least 60 days delinquent where the loan is considered one day delinquent on the day following the next payment due date. Many servicing contracts often contain a standard clause allowing the servicer to modify seriously delinquent or defaulted mortgages, or mortgages where default is “reasonably foreseeable”.
2. Foreclosure sale is not imminent and the borrower is currently not in bankruptcy, or has not been discharged from Chapter 7 bankruptcy since the loan was originated.
3. The loan was not originated as a second home or an investment property.

"We (IndyMac Bank) commend FDIC Chairman Sheila Bair for her leadership in developing a systematic loan modification protocol. FHFA, the GSEs and HOPE NOW relied heavily on the IndyMac model in developing this new protocol". As history unfolds on the U.S. Housing and Finance crisis that caused the persistent recession, the (IndyMac Bank) bankruptcy and ensuing scandal are important to understand. A dynamic interplay between social good, capital ownership and the rule of law is ongoing in the U.S. experiment with the democratic process. Much of the business models of IndyMac and also the government backed FrannieMae and FreddieMac quasi-banks were based on concentrated debt. This model became very high risk as it was based on the faulty assumption that housing values would increase. In fact, the prevalence of their mortgages greatly fed the housing bubble with significant crossfunding and possible corruption to the government regulatory function through dramatic campaign funding contributions from these organizations. In the less regulated business climate of the late 1800s, speculative bubbles were corrected by painful financial panics. True understanding is yet to be documented for the speculative housing bubble of 2008, but federal government management has seemingly replaced the severity of a financial panic with a persistent yet less severe correction. This correction is becoming known at the Great Recession.

== Fannie Mae/Freddie Mac Plan ==
In the task at hand to make headway against foreclosures and the depressed housing market. Fannie Mae and Freddie Mac entered a new phase on December 9, 2008 for a fast-track program meant to make "hundreds of thousands of mortgages affordable to people who can't currently meet their monthly payments."

Through the SMP, servicers may change the terms of a loan to reduce a borrower's first lien monthly mortgage payment, including taxes, insurance and homeowners association payments, to an amount equal to 38 percent of gross monthly income. The changes in terms may include one or more of the following:

1. Adding the accrued interest, escrow advances and costs to the principal balance of the loan, if allowed by state law;
2. Extending the length of the mortgage loan as appropriate;
3. Reducing the mortgage loan interest rate in increments of 0.125 percent to an interest rate that is not less than 3 percent. If the new rate is set below the market interest rate, after five years it will step up in annual increments to either the original loan interest rate or the market interest rate at the time of the modification, whichever is lower;
4. Forbearing on a portion of the principal, which will require the borrower to make a balloon payment when the loan matures, is paid off, or is refinanced.

=== Eligibility requirements ===
1. Conforming conventional and jumbo conforming mortgage loans originated on or before January 1, 2009;
2. Borrowers who are at least three or more payments past due and are not currently in bankruptcy;
3. Only one-unit, owner-occupied, primary residences; and
4. Current mark-to-market loan-to-value ratio of 90 percent or more.

=== New servicer guidance ===
Fannie Mae's foreclosure prevention efforts have generally been made available to a borrower only after a delinquency occurs. Under Fannie Mae's new guidance, loan servicers can use foreclosure prevention tools to assist distressed borrowers when a borrower demonstrates the need. As noted above, these guidelines apply to borrowers who are still current in their payments, but whose default is reasonably foreseeable. This new guideline is effective immediately, and borrowers may obtain information on eligibility at MakingHomeAffordable.gov.

== Hope for Homeowners Plan (HUD)/FHA ==
The HOPE for Homeowners Act (H4H) Program is effective for endorsements on or after October 1, 2008, through September 30, 2011.

- Affordability versus value: lenders will take a loss on the difference between the existing obligations and the new loan, which is set at 96.5 percent of current appraised value. The lender may choose to provide homeowners with an affordable monthly mortgage payment through a loan modification rather than accepting the losses associated with declining property values.
- Borrower eligibility: Lenders that determine the H4H program is a feasible and effective option for mitigating losses will assess the homeowner's eligibility for the program:
1. The existing mortgage was originated on or before January 1, 2008;
2. Existing mortgage payment(s) as of March 1, 2008 exceeds 31 percent of the borrowers gross monthly income for fixed-rate mortgages; For ARMs, the existing mortgage payment(s) exceeds 31 percent of the borrowers gross monthly income as of March 1, 2008 OR the date of the new loan application.
3. The homeowner did not intentionally default, does not have an ownership interest in other residential real estate and has not been convicted of fraud in the last 10 years under Federal and state law; and
4. The homeowner did not provide materially false information (e.g., lied about income) to obtain the mortgage that is being refinanced into the H4H mortgage.

=== Original cost ===
1. 3 percent upfront mortgage insurance premium and a 1.5 percent annual premium,
2. Equity and appreciation sharing with the Federal government, and
3. Prohibition against new junior liens against the property unless they are directly related to property maintenance.
- The HUDS fact sheet gives full details.

=== Updated Hope for Homeowners improvements ===
1. Eliminates 3% upfront premium
2. Reduces 1.5% annual premium to a range between .55% and .75%, based on risk-based pricing (also makes technical fix to permit discontinuation of fees when loan balance drops below certain levels, consistent with normal FHA policy)
3. Raises maximum loan to value (LTV) from 90% to 93% for borrowers above a 31% mortgage debt to income (DTI) ratio or above a 43% ratio
4. Eliminates government profit sharing of appreciation over market value of home at time of refi. Retains government declining share (from 100% to 50% after five years) of equity created by the refi, to be paid at time of sale or refi as an exit fee
5. Authorizes payments to servicers participating in successful refis
6. Administrative simplification:
  1. eliminates borrower certifications regarding not intentionally defaulting on any debt,
  2. eliminates special requirement to collect two years of tax returns,
  3. eliminates originator liability for first payment default,
  4. eliminates March 1, 2008 31% debt-to-income ratio (DTI) test,
  5. eliminates prohibition against taking out future second loans,
  6. requires Board to make documents, forms, and procedures conform to those under normal FHA loans to the maximum extent possible consistent with statutory requirements.

== Troubled Assets Relief Program ==
The Troubled Assets Relief Program is a systematic foreclosure prevention and mortgage modification program established by the Secretary, in consultation with the Chairperson of the Board of Directors of the FDIC and the Secretary of Housing and Urban Development, that—

1. Provides lenders and loan servicers with certain compensation to cover administrative costs for each loan modified according to the required standards; and
2. Provides loss sharing or guarantees for certain losses incurred if a modified loan should subsequently re-default.

=== Commitment of resources ===
The comprehensive plan established pursuant to subsection (a) shall require the commitment of funds made available to the Secretary under title I of the Emergency Economic Stabilization Act of 2008 in an amount up to $100,000,000,000 but in no case less than $40,000,000,000.

In a press conference Tuesday, Federal Housing Finance Agency director James Lockhart said the program would target high-risk borrowers — those 90 or more days delinquent on their mortgages — and employ various modification strategies to get borrowers down to an “affordable” mortgage payment, defined as 38 percent of a household's monthly gross income on a first mortgage payment.

== Analysis of the results of the government-sponsored programs ==
The Office of the Comptroller of the Currency and the Office of Thrift Supervision reported on 2009-04-03

- "Nearly one in four loan modifications in the fourth quarter actually resulted in increased monthly payments". This can occur when late fees or past-due interest are added to the monthly payment.
- The redefault rate was about 50 percent where the monthly payment was unchanged or increased, and 26 percent where the payment was decreased.

== Home Affordable Modification Program ==
=== Purpose ===
The Home Affordable Modification Program (HAMP) was established on February 18, 2009 to help up from 7 to 8 million struggling homeowners at risk of foreclosure by working with their lenders to lower monthly mortgage payments. The Program is part of the Making Home Affordable Program which was created by the Financial Stability Act of 2009. The program was built as collaboration with banks, services, credit unions, the FHA, the VA, the USDA and the Federal Housing Finance Agency, to create standard loan modification guidelines for lenders to take into consideration when evaluating a borrower for a potential loan modification. Over 110 major lenders have already signed onto the program. The Program is now looked upon as the industry standard practice for lenders to analyze potential modification applicants.

Early 2012 the Treasury redesigned the HAMP as Tier 1 for the original first-lien modification process and on June 1, 2012 Tier 2 became available. Tier 2 is for either owner-occupied properties or rental properties. For mortgages secured by rental properties, only those that are two or more payments delinquent are eligible.

=== Eligibility requirements ===
The program abides by the following eligibility and verification criteria:

- Loans originated on or before January 1, 2009
- First-lien loans on owner-occupied properties with unpaid principal balance up to $729,750
- Higher limits allowed for owner-occupied properties with 2-4 units
- All borrowers must fully document income, including signed IRS 4506-T, proof of income (i.e. paystubs or tax returns), and must sign an affidavit of financial hardship
- Property owner occupancy status will be verified through borrower credit report and other documentation; no investor-owned, vacant, or condemned properties
- Incentives to lenders and servicers to modify at risk borrowers who have not yet missed payments when the servicer determines that the borrower is at imminent risk of default
- Modifications can start from now until December 31, 2016; loans can be modified only once under the program

=== Loan modification terms and procedures ===
- Participating servicers are required to service all eligible loans under the rules of the program unless explicitly prohibited by contract; servicers are required to use reasonable efforts to obtain waivers of limits on participation.
- Participating loan servicers will be required to use a net present value (NPV) test on each loan that is at risk of imminent default or at least 60 days delinquent. The NPV test will compare the net present value of cash flows with modification and without modification. If the test is positive: meaning that the net present value of expected cash flow is greater in the modification scenario: the servicer must modify absent fraud or a contract prohibition.
- Parameters of the NPV test are spelled out in the guidelines, including acceptable discount rates, property valuation methodologies, home price appreciation assumptions, foreclosure costs and timelines, and borrower cure and redefault rate assumptions.
- Servicers will follow a specified sequence of steps in order to reduce the monthly payment to no more than 31% of gross monthly income (DTI).
- The modification sequence requires first reducing the interest rate for trial period of 3–9 months(subject to a rate floor of 2%), then if necessary extending the term or amortization of the loan up to a maximum of 40 years, and then if necessary forbearing principal. Principal forgiveness or a Hope for Homeowners refinancing are acceptable alternatives.
- It is noteworthy that this interest rate is not fixed, and will generally increase 1%/year until it reaches what ever the current rate is 5 years after the modification. Often it includes a balloon payment at the end of the first 5 years. This practice has been found controversial by many in the financial world as it is expected to bring about a slurry of new foreclosures in 5 years when homeowners will once again not be able to pay their mortgage due to the interest rate hike, or the balloon payment.
- The monthly payment includes principal, interest, taxes, insurance, flood insurance, homeowner's association and/or condominium fees. Monthly income includes wages, salary, overtime, fees, commissions, tips, social security, pensions, and all other income.
- Servicers must enter into the program agreements with Treasury's financial agent on or before December 31, 2009.

=== Payments to servicers, lenders, and responsible borrowers ===
- The Program will share with the lender/investor the cost of reductions in monthly payments from 38% DTI to 31% DTI.
- Servicers that modify loans according to the guidelines will receive an up-front fee of $1,000 for each modification, plus “pay for success” fees on still-performing loans of $1,000 per year.
- Homeowners who make their payments on time are eligible for up to $1,000 of principal reduction payments each year for up to five years.
- The program will provide one-time bonus incentive payments of $1,500 to lender/investors and $500 to servicers for modifications made while a borrower is still current on mortgage payments.
- The program will include incentives for extinguishing second liens on loans modified under this program.
- No payments will be made under the program to the lender/investor, servicer, or borrower unless and until the servicer has first entered into the program agreements with Treasury's financial agent.
- Similar incentives will be paid for Hope for Homeowner refinances.

=== Transparency and accountability ===
- Measures to prevent and detect fraud, such as documentation and audit requirements, will be central to the program.
- Servicers will be required to collect, maintain and transmit records for verification and compliance review, including borrower eligibility, underwriting, incentive payments, property verification, and other documentation.
- Freddie Mac is appointed the compliance officer of the program.

=== Warnings to people looking to apply for program ===
Foreclosure rescue and mortgage modification scams are a growing problem. Homeowners must protect themselves so they do not lose money or their home. Scammers make promises that they cannot keep, such as guarantees to “save” your home or lower your mortgage, often for a fee. Scammers may pretend that they have direct contact with your mortgage servicer when they do not.

Even amongst reputable refinance organizations, the fundamental education of the house owner is not stressed. Some may even request struggling homeowners to pledge their time to become politically active. The controversy exists between personal integrity and the concept of a 'right to homeownership'. Many euphemisms are used to implicitly stress the concept that homeownership is not the result of a lifetime of effort but a government-given right. These euphemisms like "HOPE, relief and Save-the-Dream" as used above in naming or implementing the loan modification programs. The origins of the word 'mortgage' is a death pledge—a concept that perhaps even exceeds the common view of personal integrity. At the foundation of homeownership should be a personal long-term commitment to pay the terms of the mortgage. On the bankers side of the contract, their business model is regulated by the 'social good' which are implemented by government by chartering banks. If the banks implement policies that lead to financial bubbles and panics, a democratic government is equipped with the tools to uncharter and redistribute a banks assets.Bank crisis in the united states

=== Free resources for potential applicants ===
There are free resources available for potential applicants.

- Homeowners can call the Homeowner's HOPE Hotline at 1-888-995-HOPE (4673) for information about the Making Home Affordable Program and to speak with a HUD approved housing counselor. Assistance is available in English and Spanish, and other languages by appointment.
- HUD.org helps applicants find a local counselor. HUD.gov
- MakingHomeAffordable.gov computes estimated payments and has other resources. Making Home Affordable
- Fannie Mae and Freddie Mac allow applicants see if their loan is owned by one of them and thus potentially eligible for the program Fannie Mae Loan Look Up Freddie Mac Loan Look Up

=== Lender participants ===
A list of lenders signed on is on the Making Home Affordable website List of HAMP Lenders

== See also ==
- Escrow
- Neighborhood Assistance Corporation of America (NACA)
- Mortgage assumption
- Predatory lending
