= Making Home Affordable =

The Making Home Affordable program of the United States Treasury was launched in 2009 as part of the Troubled Asset Relief Program. The main activity under MHA is the Home Affordable Modification Program.

Other programs under MHA include:

- Principal Reduction Alternative (PRA), assists homeowners with a loan-to-value ratio exceeding 115 percent.
- Home Affordable Unemployment Program (UP), temporary forbearance for unemployed homeowners.
- Second Lien Modification Program (2MP) provides a mechanism for servicers to modify second liens when a homeowner receives a first lien modification through HAMP.
- Home Affordable Foreclosure Alternatives Program (HAFA), helps homeowners exit their homes and transition to a more affordable living situation through a short sale or deed-in-lieu of foreclosure.

== Background ==
The subprime mortgage crisis was triggered by a large decline in home prices after the collapse of a housing bubble, leading to mortgage delinquencies, foreclosures, and the devaluation of housing-related securities. Declines in residential investment preceded the recession and were followed by reductions in household spending and then business investment. Spending reductions were more significant in areas with a combination of high household debt and larger housing price declines.

The housing bubble preceding the crisis was financed with mortgage-backed securities (MBSes) and collateralized debt obligations (CDOs), which initially offered higher interest rates (i.e. better returns) than government securities, along with attractive risk ratings from rating agencies. The crisis was caused by the rise in subprime lending and the increase in housing speculation. The percentage of lower-quality subprime mortgages originated during a given year rose from the historical 8% or lower range to approximately 20% from 2004 to 2006, with much higher ratios in some parts of the U.S. A high percentage of these subprime mortgages, over 90% in 2006 for example, were adjustable-rate mortgages. Housing speculation also increased, with the share of mortgage originations to investors (i.e. those owning homes other than primary residences) rising significantly from around 20% in 2000 to around 35% in 2006–2007. These changes were part of a broader trend of lowered lending standards and higher-risk mortgage products, which contributed to U.S. households becoming increasingly indebted. The ratio of household debt to disposable personal income rose from 77% in 1990 to 127% by the end of 2007.

When U.S. home prices declined steeply after peaking in mid-2006, it became more difficult for borrowers to refinance their loans. As adjustable-rate mortgages began to reset at higher interest rates (causing higher monthly payments), mortgage delinquencies soared. Securities backed with mortgages, including subprime mortgages, widely held by financial firms globally, lost most of their value.

During the 2008 United States presidential election, Presidential candidate Barack Obama promised to help homeowners who were facing foreclosure during the crisis.

== HAMP ==
The Home Affordable Modification Program (HAMP) was a government program introduced in 2009 to respond to the subprime mortgage crisis. HAMP was part of the Making Home Affordable program (MHA), established in concert with the Hardest Hit Fund program (HHF) under the Troubled Asset Relief Program (TARP), a part of the Emergency Economic Stabilization Act of 2008. HHF provided targeted aid to home owners in states hit hardest by the economic crisis and worked in tandem with HAMP and most MHA programs.

HAMP expired December 31, 2016, the last day to submit applications, and the Modification Effective Date must be on or before September 30, 2017. HHF has been extended to 2020.

=== Purpose ===
The Home Affordable Modification Program (HAMP) was designed to help financially struggling homeowners avoid foreclosure by modifying loans to a level presently affordable for borrowers and sustainable over the long term. This was done by interest rate reduction, fixing the interest rate, principal reduction or forbearance, and term extension. The program provided clear and consistent loan modification guidelines and included incentives for borrowers, servicers, and investors.

In earlier years, the property with the loan to be modified had to be the borrower's primary residence. In June 2012, HAMP was significantly revised to expand the scope of the program and clarify some troubling issues. A Tier 2 modification program was initiated permitting modifications for loans on properties not owner occupied and also allowing multiple loans on multiple properties to be modified. Pre-existing rules for owner occupied properties came under the umbrella of Tier 1 modifications.

=== Rules ===
The MHA Handbook was a consolidated reference guide outlining the requirements and guidelines for the Making Home Affordable (MHA) Program and particularly HAMP, its most popular component. A complex calculation called the net present value (NPV) test was the foundation of the HAMP program. Tier 1 and Tier 2 have their own NPV test. The NPV test predicates modification on whether the investor would make more money by modifying the mortgage rather than foreclosing.

=== Eligibility requirements ===
HAMP abided by the following eligibility and verification criteria:

- Loans originated on or before January 1, 2009
- First-lien loans with unpaid principal balance up to $729,750
- Higher limits allowed for properties with 2-4 units
- The property cannot be condemned or uninhabitable
- The borrowers' debt (housing debt for the loan to be modified) to income ratio must meet certain standards showing financial hardship. For many years the ratio had to be over 31% of gross income, but later it varied based on whether the borrower was eligible for a Tier 1 or Tier 2 modification.
- All borrowers must document income, including signed IRS 4506-T, provide proof of income (i.e. paystubs, profit and loss statement, etc.), and sign an affidavit of financial hardship.

=== Sunset of the program ===
At the Greenlining Institute 22nd Annual Economic Summit on May 8, 2015, Mel Watt announced that the program would cease end of year 2016. The Director of the FHFA had this to say regarding the program:

"Although the number of new borrowers entering these two programs continues to decline, in part because many eligible borrowers have already taken advantage of them and in part because of recovering house prices, lenders and servicers are continuing to approve new HAMP modifications and HARP refinances. Extending HAMP and HARP through the end of 2016 will provide real relief for borrowers who continue to face challenges either paying their mortgage or refinancing their loan."

=== Modifications of second loans ===
Once the first loan was modified under HAMP, if the second loan was eligible (and in most cases it was), it too was either modified or partially or fully extinguished. This program expired on December 31, 2016.

=== Criticism ===
In his book Bailout: How Washington Abandoned Main Street While Rescuing Wall Street, Neil Barofsky argues that Treasury Secretary Tim Geithner never had the intention to utilize the program as intended by Congress. Instead of providing relief for homeowners to avoid foreclosures, it was Geithner's plan that the bank should proceed with foreclosures. Geithner "estimates" that the banks "can handle ten million foreclosures, over time", and that HAMP "will help foam the runway for them" by "keeping the full flush of foreclosures from hitting the financial system all at the same time." As such, "banks participating in the program have rejected four million borrowers’ requests for help, or 72 percent of their applications, since the process began". Citimortgage and JPMorgan Chase were among the banks that refused the most HAMP claims. As such, the program only helped 887,001 people out of the over 4 Million people that were originally estimated to be able to benefit from the program.

== See also ==
- Loan modification in the United States
- Home Affordable Refinance Program (HARP)
