= RealtyTrac =

RealtyTrac is a real estate information company and an online marketplace for foreclosed and defaulted properties in the United States. It was founded in 1993 and is based in Santa Barbara, California. It publishes a monthly U.S. Foreclosure Market Report.

In November 2011 Renovo Capital LLC, a private equity firm, bought a majority stake in the company and formed a new company, Renwood RealtyTrac LLC. James Saccacio was replaced as CEO by Brandon Moore, previously a senior executive at One Technologies, with Saccacio staying as a spokesman and board member.

In August 2012, CEO Brandon Moore was replaced by acting President and COO James Moyle, who joined RealtyTrac during the acquisition of Homefacts in April 2012, where he was CEO.

In 2022, RealtyTrac was acquired by Nations Info Corp. Following the acquisition, David Teng, who had joined Nations Info Corp as President in 2020, was appointed CEO of RealtyTrac.

== Operation ==
The site has over 1 million "distressed" properties in its database at any time. In 2008 they had 150 data collectors, who collected data directly from notices posted on courthouse noticeboards or from county recorder offices. The site charges a monthly fee for access to their listings. The company provides data to MSN Real Estate, Yahoo! Real Estate and The Wall Street Journal and from 2005 they press release monthly figures on foreclosures that they say are a good indicator of real estate appreciation or depreciation. Government agencies and Wall Street analysts also use the data, which are given free to government bodies.

== History ==
=== Beginnings ===
Serial entrepreneur, Derek White, together with co-founder Joe Doyle, founded RealtyTrac Information Systems in Santa Barbara, California, in 1994;.Alternatively, the company is also reported as being founded in 1996 by White with programmer Michael Keane. Initially, the business located repossessed houses and sold the information to real estate agents, expanding by 1998 to cover 100,000 properties in the state of California.

In 1996 White teamed up with Hughes Aircraft Research Engineer Ronald Schwarzrock to found Realtytrac Information Systems LLC, with Keane as the lead programmer.

In 1998 Schwarzrock left Hughes Aircraft; he and Derek White opened the office in Westlake Village, California, just down the street from Realtor.com. They raised nearly $1.8 million from 78 investors which allowed the company to build an expanded robust system.

During the early days of the company, foreclosure information was limited to California. In 1998 the company had records on 180,000 Californian properties as data was obtained from smaller companies that transcribed property records from typically only one county or municipality. With the new hardware and software in place, White made a deal with Mike Ela, President of Dataquick at the time for foreclosure data from all 50 states through DataQuick's partner Acxiom.

In January 2000, then Vice President at Comerica Bank, Matthew Mara (a golfing buddy of Mr. Schwarzrock) arranged a meeting between RealtyTrac LLC and First Security Van Kasper of Newport Beach, California, a brokerage and investment-banking company. They had just taken Homeseekers Public (NASDAQ: HMSK), and were extremely excited to partner with RealtyTrac and were ready to raise up to $20 million to fund RealtyTrac's growth. Unfortunately in less than 30 days the world would witness the infamous dot-com crash, which dried up any hope for new VC funding. White and Schwarzrock went to Mara to set up a meeting with Rich Toubman's financial services firm, Global Vantage Ltd, located in Newport Beach. One of the attendees in that meeting was James Saccacio who obtained the expansion capital for RealtyTrac. Mr. Saccacio relocated RealtyTrac to its former location in Irvine, California.

=== Move nationwide ===
A reduction in foreclosures in California coupled with start-up costs resulted in the company failing to make a profit, and so in July 2000, when the company was based in Westlake Village, they launched a national website to sell data from DataQuick Information Systems for a daily or monthly charge. In 2000, Jim Saccacio stepped in as the CEO after White left to start Stellar Real Estate Solutions in Ohio. The CEO from October 2000 until November 2011 was Saccacio, previously principal at Transition Management Group. Saccacio, assisted by White's vision to sell data to Yahoo Real Estate, helped move the company from a statewide business to a national one.

=== Great Recession 2007 – 2009 ===
In 2007 the Colorado Division and Housing and the Mortgage Bankers Association, among others, complained that by counting the three stages of foreclosure separately the company was overstating foreclosure levels and the company changed their counting methods to only count properties once in their figures. During this period comparisons in data over time were complicated by changes in methodologies and in the increase in the number of counties that data was gathered from.

=== 2011 purchase ===
Renovo Capital LLC, a private equity firm, bought a majority stake in the company in November 2011 and formed a new company, Renwood RealtyTrac LLC. Saccacio was replaced as CEO by Brandon Moore, previously a senior executive at One Technologies, with Saccacio staying as a spokesman and board member.

== Reception ==
In 2007, the site was rated as the third largest real estate site by MediaMatrix. The New York banking superintendent said that "RealtyTrac is now setting the standard by which this information gets reported".

In response to the suggestion that people regard the company as "grave dancers", Saccacio responded that "We provide a potential solution to people with a problem. By democratizing the data, we help people in a bad situation."
