= Deed in lieu of foreclosure =

Deed instrument in property law

A deed in lieu of foreclosure is a deed instrument in which a mortgagor (i.e. the borrower) conveys all interest in a real property to the mortgagee (i.e. the lender) to satisfy a loan that is in default and avoid foreclosure proceedings.

The deed in lieu of foreclosure offers several advantages to both the borrower and the lender. The principal advantage to the borrower is that it immediately releases the borrower from most or all of the personal indebtedness associated with the defaulted loan. The borrower also avoids the public notoriety of a foreclosure proceeding and may receive more generous terms compared to a formal foreclosure. Another benefit to the borrower is that it harms a borrower's credit less than a foreclosure does. Advantages to a lender include a reduction in the time and cost of a repossession, lower risk of borrower revenge (metal theft and vandalism of the property before sheriff eviction), and additional advantages if the borrower subsequently files for bankruptcy.

If there are any junior liens a deed in lieu is a less attractive option for the lender. The lender will likely not want to assume the liability of the junior liens from the property owner, and accordingly, the lender will prefer to foreclose in order to clean the title.

In order to be considered a deed in lieu of foreclosure, the indebtedness must be secured by the real estate being transferred. Both sides must enter into the transaction voluntarily and in good faith. The settlement agreement must have total consideration that is at least equal to the fair market value of the property being conveyed. Sometimes, the lender will not proceed with a deed in lieu of foreclosure if the outstanding indebtedness of the borrower exceeds the current fair value of the property; in other cases, a lender will agree since it will likely end up with the property anyway through the costly foreclosure process.

Because of the requirement that the instrument be voluntary, lenders will often not act upon a deed in lieu of foreclosure unless they receive a written offer of such a conveyance from the borrower that specifically states that the offer to enter into negotiations is being made voluntarily. This will enact the parol evidence rule and protect the lender from a possible subsequent claim that the lender acted in bad faith or pressured the borrower into the settlement. Both sides may then proceed with settlement negotiation. The Home Equity Theft Prevention Act in New York has created some confusion regarding this frequently used method of settlement. It is unclear whether HETPA applies to deeds in lieu of foreclosure since there is no clear exclusion as there is for a referee's deed, for example. The 2-year right of rescission is not a risk that banks or title insurers are comfortable with, especially given the complexities of compliance, so many banks and title insurers in New York are not willing to work with deeds in lieu.

== See also ==
- Loss mitigation
- Foreclosure
