= Negative equity =

Concept in homeowners' mortgages

Negative equity is a deficit of owner's equity, occurring when the value of an asset used to secure a loan is less than the outstanding balance on the loan. In the United States, assets (particularly real estate, whose loans are mortgages) with negative equity are often referred to as being "underwater", and loans and borrowers with negative equity are said to be "upside down".

People and companies alike may have negative equity, as reflected on their balance sheets.

== History ==
The term negative equity was widely used in the United Kingdom during the economic recession between 1991 and 1996, and in Hong Kong between 1998 and 2003. These recessions led to increased unemployment and a decline in property prices, which in turn led to an increase in repossessions by banks and building societies of properties worth less than the outstanding debt.

Since 2007, those most exposed to negative equity are borrowers who obtained loans of a high percentage of the property value (such as 90% or even 100%). These were commonly available before the credit crunch.

== In an asset ==
In the owner-occupied housing market, a fall in the market value of a mortgaged house or apartment/flat is the usual cause of negative equity. It may occur when the property owner obtains second-mortgage home equity loans, causing the combined loans to exceed the home value, or simply because the original mortgage was too generous. If the borrower defaults, repossession and sale of the property by the lender will not raise enough cash to repay the amount outstanding, and the borrower will still be in debt as well as having lost the property. Some US states like California require lenders to choose between legal actions (such as wage garnishment) against the borrower or taking repossession, but not both.

It is also common for negative equity to occur when the value of a good drops shortly after its purchase. This occurs frequently in automobile loans, where the market value of a car might drop by 20-30% as soon as the car is driven off the lot.

While typically a result of fluctuating asset prices, negative equity can occur when the value of the asset stays fixed and the loan balance increases because loan payments are less than the interest, a situation known as negative amortization. The typical assets securing such loans are real property – commercial, office or residential. When the loan is nonrecourse, the lender can only look to the security, that is, the value of the property, when the borrower fails to repay the loan.

== Negative net worth ==
A person who has negative equity can be said to have "negative net worth", where the person's liabilities exceed their assets. One might come to have negative equity as a result of taking out a substantial, unsecured loan. For example, one might use a student loan to pursue higher education. Although education increases the likelihood of higher future earnings, potential alone is not a financial asset.

In the United States, student loans are rarely dischargeable in bankruptcy, and typically lenders provide student loans without requiring security. This stands in contrast to lenders requiring borrowers to have an equity stake in a comparably-sized real estate loan, as described above, secured by both a down payment and a mortgage. An explanation for the willingness of creditors to provide unsecured student loans is that, in a practical sense, American student loans are secured by the borrower's future earnings. This is so since creditors may legally garnish wages when a borrower defaults.

== Effects ==
A homeowner who is under water might be financially incapable of selling their current house and buying another one.

== See also ==
- Equity (finance)
- Home equity protection
- Loss mitigation
- Mortgage loans
- Negative amortization
- Strategic default
