= American Homeowner Preservation =

- Trade name: American Homeowner Preservation 2015+ LLC
- Type: Limited liability company
- Industry: Finance, Financial Services, FinTech, Service Industry, Residential Real Estate
- Founded: May 2008 (as a 501(c)) non-profit
- Founder: Jorge Newbery
- Headquarters: Greater Chicago Area, Great Lakes, USA
- Services: Financial Services
- Website: https://www.ahpfund.com

American Homeowner Preservation (also known as AHP) is an online real estate crowdfunding platform which purchases pools of nonperforming loans from banks and other lenders and then offers borrowers who want to stay in their homes debt restructuring options with reduced payments and discounted principal balances. If homes are vacant or families want to move, AHP offers deficiency waivers and incentive payments to cooperate with short sales in order to put the homes back into service.

Founded in 2008 as a 501c nonprofit in Cincinnati, Ohio, AHP pioneered the short sale leaseback as a foreclosure prevention operation to assist struggling homeowners. Faced with resistance from many banks which insisted that families vacate their homes in order to have their short sales approved, AHP changed their strategy in early 2011 and now operates as a for-profit headquartered in Chicago.

In October 2013, AHP became an online real estate crowdfunding platform offering investment opportunities to accredited investors, and in June 2016 opened to non-accredited investors as well under Title IV of the JOBS Act (called Regulation A+).

== Inception ==
American Homeowner Preservation, Inc. (AHP) was established in October 2007 as a non-profit organization focused on helping homeowners at risk of foreclosure stay in their homes. In May 2008, an office was opened in Cincinnati. In August 2008, AHP received their 501(c)(3) designation as a nonprofit from the Internal Revenue Service. Envisioning that AHP would be financed with tax exempt bonds, AHP sought the assistance of the Summit County Port Authority. In September 2008, SCPA voted unanimously to induce up to 12.5 million in bonds to fund AHP. AHP proceeded to market their program in the greater Akron region and—by year-end—close to 300 families had signed purchase contracts to sell their homes to AHP. However, citing concerns about the Board and backers of AHP along with a challenged bond market the bond resolution was rescinded in February 2009. AHP transitioned into a for-profit American Homeowner Preservation, LLC in July 2009, seeking to match investors with homeowners at risk of losing their homes.

== Transition To For-Profit ==
After the bond resolution was rejected by the Summit County Port Authority, American Homeowner Preservation sought new ways to fund its endeavors. Jorge Newbery transitioned from a Consultant to American Homeowner Preservation Inc. to Director of American Homeowner Preservation LLC, a for-profit which took over the nonprofit AHP's mission. Instead of using bond funding to purchase homeowners homes, the program started matching private investors to purchase the homes on short sale. In October 2013 Newbery added online crowdfunding to AHP's investment model to simplify the investment process and reach more investors.

== Funding ==
Originally modeled to be financed with tax-exempt municipal bonds, American Homeowner Preservation's efforts are now primarily supported by both accredited investors (including high-net-worth individuals and institutional investors), as well as non-accredited investors through a Regulation A+ offering. In October 2013 AHP transitioned to an equity crowdfunding model after Title II of the JOBS Act lifted a ban preventing private startups and small businesses from publicly soliciting funding.

Revenue is then generated in the forms of rents and mortgage payments from the people whose homes AHP services.

== AHP Formulas for Borrower Solutions ==
AHP uses the current value of the home as the basis for determining the modified payments, principal discounts and incentive payments offered to borrowers. As a result of this formulaic approach, borrowers are not required to furnish significant documents in order to obtain mortgage modifications. This is uncommon in the mortgage industry, in which many lenders require extensive documentation.

== See also ==
- 2008 financial crisis
- 311 Foreclosure Prevention Programs
- Deed in lieu of foreclosure
- Equity stripping
- Forbearance
- Hope Now Alliance
- HUD auction
- Loss mitigation
- Repossession
- Real estate trends
- Tax taking - Tax Sales, Tax Auctions, Tax Foreclosures
