= Kreglinger v New Patagonia Meat and Cold Storage Co Ltd =

Kreglinger v New Patagonia Ltd
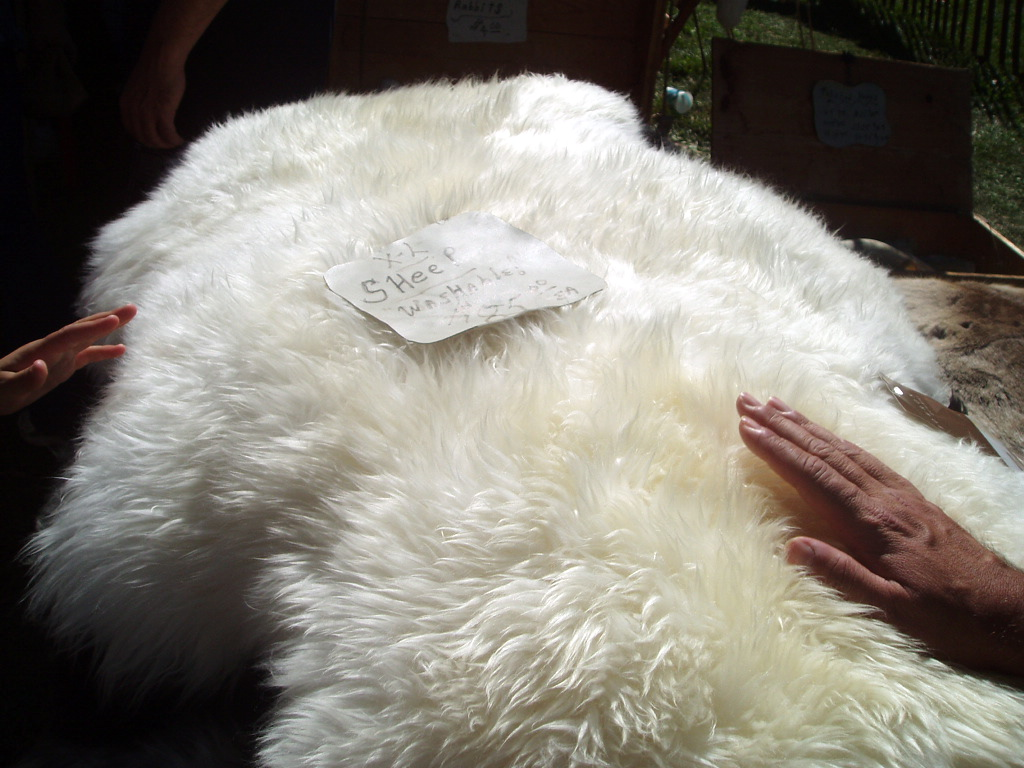
- Court: House of Lords
- Citations: [1913] UKHL 1, [1914] AC 25

Court membership
- Judges sitting: Lord Haldane LC; Lord Halsbury; Lord Atkinson; Lord Mersey; Lord Parker

Keywords
- Floating charge, option, exclusivity, restraint of trade, equity of redemption

Kreglinger v New Patagonia Meat & Cold Storage Co Ltd [1913] UKHL 1 is an English property law and UK insolvency law case, concerning whether an exclusivity agreement for buying sheepskins, that accompanied a loan, frustrated the borrower's right to pay off and discharge its debt.

== Facts ==
In 1910 Kreglinger, who ran a woolbroker firm, agreed to lend New Patagonia Meat Ltd £10,000 secured by a floating charge on its business, repayable in five years, with an option to repay the remaining sum on a month’s notice. In addition, New Patagonia agreed to sell sheepskins exclusively to Kreglinger, or pay a commission if they sold to other persons, so long as New Patagonia gave the best price. When New Patagonia paid off the loan in 1913, and wished to start selling its sheepskins to other firms, Kreglinger claimed the right to an injunction to restrain them. New Patagonia argued that (i) that the provision was unconscionable, (ii) the exclusivity provision was in the nature of a penalty or a clog on the equity of redemption and should be consequently held void, and (iii) that the provision was repugnant to equitable right to redeem.

Lord Cozens-Hardy MR, Buckley LJ and Kennedy LJ held that the agreement was void. Kreglinger appealed.

== Judgment ==
The House of Lords held that the option to purchase the sheepskins exclusively for five years was separate and sound from the main contract and not void, given that the purpose of the clog on equity of redemption rules was chiefly to preclude unconscionable bargains. Lord Haldane LC gave a general background to the rule that there be no clogs on the equity of redemption and remarked,

the rules I have stated have now been applied by Courts of Equity for nearly three centuries, and the books are full of illustrations of their application. But what I have pointed out shews that it is inconsistent with the objects for which they were established that these rules should crystallize into technical language so rigid that the letter can defeat the underlying spirit and purpose. Their application must correspond with the practical necessities of the time.

Lord Halsbury and Lord Atkinson concurred. Lord Mersey delivered a short concurrence. Lord Parker held too that the agreement was not void.

This is consistent with the principle underlying the rule as to clogging the equity. In relieving from penalties or forfeitures equity has always endeavoured to put the parties as far as possible into the position in which they would have been if no penalty or forfeiture had occurred. It is only in the case of mortgages to secure moneys advanced by way of loan that there was ever any equity to redeem on terms not involving performance of the bargain between the parties... ...there is now no rule in equity which precludes a mortgagee, whether the mortgage be made upon the occasion of a loan or otherwise, from stipulating for any collateral advantage, provided such collateral advantage is not either (1.) unfair and unconscionable, or (2.) in the nature of a penalty clogging the equity of redemption, or (3.) inconsistent with or repugnant to the contractual and equitable right to redeem.

== See also ==
- Vernon v Bethell
- Knightsbridge Estates Trust Ltd v Byrne [1940] AC 613
- Santley v Wilde [1899] 2 Ch 474
