= Santley v Wilde =

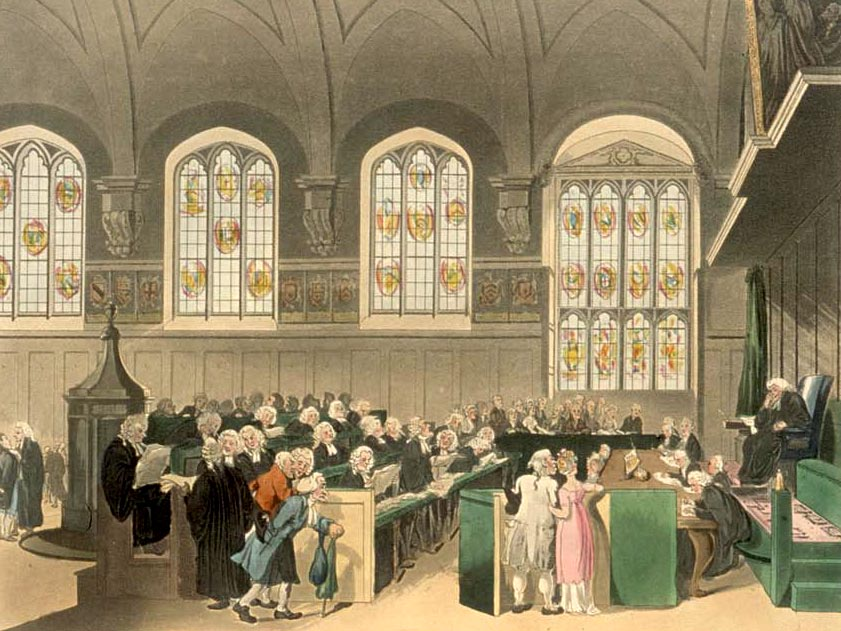
- Court of Chancery
- Court: Court of Appeal
- Decided: 4 April 1899
- Citations: [1899] 2 Ch 474; 68 LJ Ch 681; 81 LT 393; 48 WR 90; 15 TLR 528

Case history
- Appealed from: [1899] 1 Ch 747

Court membership
- Judges sitting: Lindley MR; Sir F.H. Jeune; Romer LJ

Keywords
- mortgage; equity of redemption; clog on the equity of redemption; unconscionable bargains

Santley v Wilde [1899] 2 Ch 474 is a decision of the English Court of Appeal in relation to the legal nature of a mortgage, and to what extent a provision in a mortgage may be struck down as a fetter or "clog" on the equity of redemption.

The court held on the facts that a provision giving the lender a share of the profits of the operations of the theatre company granting the mortgage was not repugnant to the equity of redemption, and was valid.

== Facts ==
The mortgagor was a woman who held a ten-year lease of a property, and she wished to borrow £2,000 to carry on a theatre. The mortgagee agreed to lend her that sum repayable over a period of five years, plus interest, and in addition he was to receive one-third of the profits of the theatre from the date of the mortgage to the end of the lease (i.e. beyond the date when the mortgage would have been fully repaid).

== Court of Appeal ==
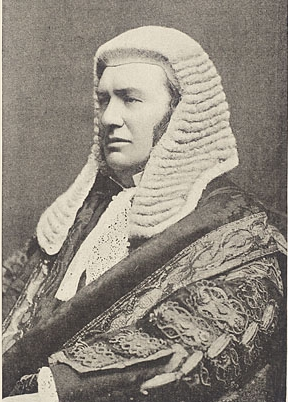
Sir Nathaniel Lindley MR

The lead judgment was given by the Master of the Rolls, Sir Nathaniel Lindley. His decision is remembered as much for the important statements that he made about the nature of a mortgage under English law as for the decision on the issue at hand.

At the outset of his judgment he expressed the view:

‘a mortgage is a conveyance of land or an assignment of chattels as a security for the payment of a debt or the discharge of some other obligation for which it is given. This is the idea of a mortgage: and the security is redeemable on the payment or discharge of such debt or obligation, any provision to the contrary notwithstanding. That, in my opinion, is the law.’

He then expounded:

‘Any provision inserted to prevent redemption on payment or performance of the debt or obligation for which the security was given is what is meant by a clog or fetter on the equity of redemption and is therefore void. It follows from this that "once a mortgage always a mortgage";’

He held that the provision relating to the share of the profits was not a clog upon the equity of the redemption. He felt that, given the limited security a mortgage over a ten-year lease offered, it was a reasonable bargain and did not unduly fetter the right of the mortgagor to redeem. The giving of a share of the profits was not repugnant to the nature of the security.

== Commentary ==
The case has been cited subsequently with approval in various decisions, including the House of Lords in Kreglinger v New Patagonia Meat and Cold Storage Co Ltd [1913] UKHL 1. More recently it was cited with approval in Brighton and Hove City Council v Audus [2009] EWHC 340 (Ch) at para [44].

It is also cited with approval by leading texts, Fisher & Lightwood's Law of Mortgage who described it as 'the classic description of a mortgage', and Cousins on the Law of Mortgages.

Most of the approval of the case relates to the principles that it enunciates. The actual decision on the merits was strongly criticised by Lord Macnaghten and Lord Davey in Noakes v Rice [1902] AC 24. It was criticised by Lord Macnaghten again in Bradley v Carritt [1903] UKHL 1, a case in which Nathaniel Lindley (by then: Lord Lindley) also sat, and which he dissented but also conceded "Santley v Wilde was a difficult case, and it may have been wrongly decided, although I do not think it was." The case was similarly criticised in British South Africa Company v De Beers Consolidated Mines Ltd [1912] AC 52.
