= Insolvency law of Switzerland =

Insolvency, foreclosure, bankruptcy and debt restructuring in Switzerland

The insolvency law of Switzerland is the law governing insolvency, foreclosure, bankruptcy and debt restructuring proceedings in Switzerland. It is principally codified in the Federal Statute on Debt Enforcement and Bankruptcy (German: Bundesgesetz über Schuldbetreibung und Konkurs, SchKG; French: Loi fédérale sur la poursuite pour dettes et la faillite, LP; Italian: Legge federale sulla esecuzione e sul fallimento, LEF) of 11 April 1889 (as amended) as well as in ancillary federal and cantonal laws.

The enforcement of non-monetary obligations is subject to civil proceedings according to the federal Code of Civil Procedure (Schweizerische Zivilprozessordnung, ZPO).

== Introductory proceedings ==
Creditors may initiate debt enforcement proceedings (Betreibungsverfahren / procédure de poursuite) by filing a debt collection request (Betreibungsbegehren / réquisition de poursuite) against the debtor with the competent cantonal debt collection office (DCO; Betreibungsamt / office des poursuites). That request does not require any proof of the validity of the creditor's claim. The DCO will then serve a summons for payment (Zahlungsbefehl / commandement de payer) on the debtor.

If the debtor contests the creditor's claim, he may lodge a verbal or written objection (Rechtsvorschlag / Opposition) with the DCO within ten days of the receipt of the summons for payment. In that event, the creditor must procure a court order dismissing the objection (Rechtsöffnung / mainlevée de l'opposition) in order to proceed with the enforcement of his claim:

- The creditor may do so by filing an ordinary lawsuit against the debtor for the payment of the sum at issue.
- If the creditor is already in possession of a valid court verdict confirming the contested debt, he may petition the cantonal court at the location of the DCO for a definitive dismissal of the objection.
- If he is in possession of a signed or notarised promise by the debtor to pay the sum at issue, he may petition the court for a provisional dismissal of the objection. The provisional dismissal becomes effective if the debtor does not initiate a lawsuit contesting the validity of the creditor's claim within twenty days.

If the debtor does not file an objection, or after the objection has been validly dismissed by the courts, the creditor may request execution proceedings to be initiated.

== Execution proceedings ==
The form of the execution proceedings generally depends on the nature of the debt and on the legal status of the debtor (although numerous exceptions and some special modes of execution exist):

- Debt collection by realising pledged property (Betreibung auf Pfandverwertung / poursuite en réalisation du gage): If the creditor's debt is secured by a pledge or a mortgage, the pledged property is seized and sold at auction by the DCO, as described below. These are the foreclosure proceedings under Swiss law.
- Debt collection by seizure of assets (Betreibung auf Pfändung / poursuite par voie de saisie): If the debt is not secured, and if the debtor is not a registered commercial entity but a private individual, all his assets can be seized and sold at auction.
- Debt collection by bankruptcy (Betreibung auf Konkurs / poursuite par voie de faillite): If the debt is not secured, and if the debtor is a registered commercial entity (such as a corporation), bankruptcy proceedings ensue. Under special circumstances, other persons can be subject to bankruptcy proceedings as well. For the settlement of certain debts (such as tax debts) a seizure of assets takes place instead of bankruptcy.

=== Debt collection by realising pledged property or seizure of assets ===
The seizure of assets is initiated by an application for continuation (Fortsetzungsbegehren / demande de continuation) filed by the creditor with the DCO. Unless the proceedings are limited to an item of pledged property to begin with (as in the case of foreclosure), the DCO will inventory all assets of the debtor (such as cash, valuables, real estate and future salary payments) and seize them (Pfändung / saisie) to the extent that is required to satisfy the involved creditor(s).

Any non-liquid assets are generally sold by the DCO at a public auction. Items secured by a prior pledge or mortgage are sold only at a price sufficient to cover the amount of the mortgage, unless the creditor holding the security has requested the seizure and liquidation himself. If the proceeds of the liquidation do not cover the debt(s) at issue as well as the cost of the proceedings, the creditors receive a certificate of unpaid debts (Verlustschein / acte de défaut de biens) that allows them to re-initiate execution proceedings at a later time.

=== Debt collection by bankruptcy ===
The proceedings of debt collection by bankruptcy under Swiss law are roughly comparable to those under Chapter 7 of the U.S. bankruptcy code. Bankruptcy (Konkurs / faillite) must be declared by the competent cantonal court on the request of the creditor. Once it is declared, the debtor loses all control over his assets and business, and the cantonal bankruptcy office (BO) establishes a provisional inventory of the assets.

If the assets appear sufficient to cover at least the cost of bankruptcy proceedings, the BO publishes the bankruptcy in the Swiss Official Gazette of Commerce (SOGC), whereby all creditors are asked to submit their claims to the BO. The BO also calls a creditors' meeting within 20 days, in which the creditors may entrust either a private trustee or the BO with the administration of the bankruptcy.

Various court proceedings may be initiated at this stage between the creditors, the debtor, the bankruptcy administrator and third parties to determine the validity of the creditors' claims, their relative rank, and the assignment of disputed assets or liabilities to the debtor or to third parties. Once the schedule of claims (Kollokationsplan / état de collocation) as well as the assets and liabilities of the debtor are no longer contested, the second creditors' meeting may decide on the mode of liquidation of the bankrupt business; this may include a sale at auction or a direct sale of assets.

The proceeds of the liquidation are discharged to the creditors in accordance to their rank as established in the schedule of claims. Certain creditors (such as employees for the salaries of up to six months, or for social security payments) are accorded a higher rank by law and are paid out before all other creditors. To the extent the creditors remain unpaid, they receive certificates to that effect by the BO, but they may not initiate new insolvency proceedings against the debtor unless they can prove that he has acquired new assets.

== Debtor protection ==
At most stages of the debt enforcement process, the law allows the debtor to stay the proceedings by settling his debts, coming to an accommodation with his debtors or requesting a court to examine the (continued) validity of the debtors' claims. Certain assets that are considered essential to the financial and physical survival of the debtor and his family are also exempt from all enforcement proceedings.

== Security measures ==
Creditors may request the courts to take certain measures to secure the debtor's assets in order to make them available for eventual liquidation. The most important of these measures are the arrest of assets (Arrest / séquestre) and the challenge of unfair preferences (Anfechtung / révocation).

=== Arrest ===
Creditors may request a court to order an arrest to be laid on certain assets belonging to the debtor. The arrest has the effect of a provisional seizure of these assets.

An arrest may only be ordered if the creditor can establish the prima facie validity of his claim as well as one of several statutory prerequisites for an arrest. An arrest may notably be imposed if the debtor holds a certificate of unpaid debts against the debtor, if the debtor attempts to hide or dispose of his assets, or if the debtor is not resident in Switzerland. The arrest of the assets of foreign debtors also establishes a venue in Switzerland under Swiss private international law in which the debtor may be sued by the creditor, except if the Lugano Convention is applicable.

The arrest ends if it is successfully appealed in court, or if the creditor does not prosecute his claim by means of a lawsuit or a debt collection request within ten days after the arrest.

=== Challenge of unfair preferences ===
Creditors who hold a certificate of unpaid debts against the debtor, or creditors in a bankruptcy, may file suit against third parties who have benefited from unfair preferences or fraudulent transfers by the debtor prior to a seizure of assets or a bankruptcy. If the challenge succeeds, the third party must return the assets formerly belonging to the debtor to the DBO or the BO, as the case may be, and the debtor may also be liable for criminal prosecution for bankruptcy fraud.

The law distinguishes three kinds of challenges:

- Challenge of gifts (Schenkungsanfechtung / cas de libéralités): Gratuitous or effectively gratuitous transfers of assets by the debtor may be challenged if they took place within a year prior to the seizure of assets or the bankruptcy. Good-faith recipients of a gift must return it only to the extent that they remain enriched by it.
- Challenge of over-indebtedness (Überschuldungsanfechtung / cas de surendettement): Certain acts of the debtor that impart an unfair preference to another creditor, such as the securing of a previously unsecured debt, may be challenged if they took place within a year prior to the seizure of assets or the bankruptcy, if the debtor was already over-indebted at the time and if the other creditor cannot prove that he could not have been aware of the over-indebtedness.
- Challenge of deliberate disadvantagement (Absichtsanfechtung / cas de dol): Any other acts by the debtor may be challenged if they took place within five years prior to the seizure of assets or the bankruptcy, and if they occurred in the debtor's manifest intent to disadvantage his creditors or to benefit certain creditors to the disadvantage of others.

== Debt restructuring ==
The law provides for debt restructuring agreements (Nachlassvertrag / concordat), comparable to Chapter 11 proceedings in the United States. These are court-mediated or out-of-court settlements between the debtor and his creditors aimed at preempting full bankruptcy proceedings.

=== Debt restructuring moratorium ===
If out-of-court settlement efforts fail or are not undertaken, the debtor or a creditor may initiate the statutory proceedings by petitioning the competent cantonal court for a provisional, then a definitive debt restructuring moratorium (Nachlassstundung / sursis concordataire). The moratorium may last for four to six months, but may be prolonged to up to 24 months in exceptionally complex cases. It suspends or prevents most debt enforcement proceedings against the debtor, but also makes most business decisions of the debtor subject to approval by a court-appointed administrator (Sachwalter / commissaire).

The administrator must inventory the debtors' assets, publish a call to the creditors and negotiate a debt restructuring agreement with the creditors. If the agreement is not concluded or if the moratorium expires, any creditor may request an immediate declaration of bankruptcy.

=== Debt restructuring agreement ===
A statutory debt restructuring agreement requires the consent of either a majority of the creditors representing two-thirds of the sum of the claims, or a quarter of the creditors representing at least three-quarters of the sum of the claims; in addition, it must be ratified by the court. It may be negotiated during a debt restructuring moratorium, as described above, or in the course of bankruptcy proceedings. Once concluded, it takes effect with respect to all creditors and sets an end to all ongoing debt enforcement proceedings.

Two types of restructuring agreements can be concluded:

- Ordinary debt restructuring agreements (Ordentlicher Nachlassvertrag / concordat ordinaire) provide for a partial waiver of the creditors' claims and for a schedule of debt repayments.
- Debt restructuring agreements with assignment of assets (Nachlassvertrag mit Vermögensabtretung / concordat par abandon d’actif) are aimed at the liquidation of the debtor's assets, much like bankruptcy proceedings. They provide for a sale of the debtor's assets to the creditors or to third parties. The liquidation is executed by a liquidator designated in the agreement, who is supervised by a creditors' committee. Since 2001, the liquidation of SAirGroup (the former corporate parent of Swissair) is being executed under this procedure.

=== Settlement of private debt by agreement ===
Debtors who are not subject to bankruptcy proceedings, such as private individuals, may petition the court for the settlement of private debt by agreement (Einvernehmliche private Schuldenbereinigung / règlement amiable des dettes).

If the court approves the petition, it orders a moratorium on the enforcement of most debts, which may be prolonged to up until six months. The court also appoints an administrator, who is tasked to negotiate an out-of-court settlement with the creditors. If the negotiations fail or the moratorium expires, normal debt enforcement proceedings may resume.

== Abuses of the system ==
In 2025, an investigation by the RTS uncovered a significant bankruptcy fraud scheme, where hundreds of entrepreneurs used 40 "strawmen" to accumulate fraudulent bankruptcies across about 700 companies. These strawmen, often retirees with nothing to lose, would take over struggling companies, move their headquarters to obscure debts, and then abandon them to bankruptcy, allowing the real owners to escape debts and continue operations under new companies. One such strawman accumulated 40 bankruptcies in eight years. The scheme particularly affected the construction industry and cost taxpayers millions through unpaid taxes, social security contributions, and COVID loans.

== Literature ==
- Kurt Amonn; Fridolin Walther (2008). Grundriss des Schuldbetreibungs- und Konkursrechts (in German) (8th ed.). Stämpfli. ISBN 978-3-7272-0817-1.
- Marc Hunziker; Michel Pellascio (2008). Schuldbetreibungs- und Konkursrecht, Repetitorium (in German). Orell Füssli. ISBN 978-3-280-07072-7.
- Stephen V. Berti (1998). Swiss Debt Enforcement and Bankruptcy Law: English Translation of the Amended Federal Statute on Debt Enforcement and Bankruptcy Law with an Introduction to Swiss Debt Enforcement and Bankruptcy Law. Kluwer Law International. ISBN 978-90-411-0519-6.
