= Doctrine of exoneration of liens =

The doctrine of exoneration of liens (sometimes simply referred to as "doctrine of exoneration") refers to a common law rule. The rule says that encumbrances (i.e. a mortgage) of a property conveyed by a will is discharged with funds from the originating estate, not from the property itself.
