= British South Africa Company v De Beers Consolidated Mines Ltd =

- Arms of the British South Africa Company
- Court: Court of Appeal
- Citations: [1910] 2 Ch 502 [1910] LJ Ch 65 (1910) 103 LT 4 (1910) 26 TLR 591

Case history
- Appealed from: [1910] 1 Ch 354
- Appealed to: [1912] AC 52 [1911] 12 WLUK 10 HL

Court membership
- Judges sitting: Lord Cozens-Hardy MR; Farwell LJ; Kennedy LJ

Keywords
- conflict of laws; mortgage; equity of redemption; clogging the equity

British South Africa Company v De Beers Consolidated Mines Ltd [1910] 2 Ch 502 is a judicial decision of the English Court of Appeal relating to the conflict of laws, and clogs upon the equity of redemption.

The British South Africa Company (BSAC) entered into an agreement with De Beers under which De Beers loaned various sums of money to BSAC, and BSAC granted security over all its assets in the form of a floating charge as collateral for the loans. That agreement also contained a provision which granted De Beers the exclusive right to mine diamonds south of the Zambezi river in perpetuity.

BSAC brought proceedings against De Beers in the English courts arguing that the provision for the exclusive mining of diamonds was unenforceable for various different reasons. The English Court of Appeal held that the provision was invalid because it constituted "a clog" on the equity of redemption, and that notwithstanding the property was located in a country that did not recognise the concept of an equity of redemption, the English courts would nevertheless apply the doctrine on the basis that the agreement was governed by English law and it could make an order on the parties in personam.

The decision was reversed on other grounds by the House of Lords, but the Court of Appeal decision remains a leading authority in relation to clogs on the equity of redemption and the conflict of laws.

== Background ==
The case revolved around two key documents, both of which had extensive particulars set out in the report of the High Court judgment. The first of these was the charter of the BSAC. The most important of these, for the purposes of the case, was clause 20, which provided: "Nothing in this our charter shall be deemed to authorize the company to set up or grant any monopoly of trade..."

The second was an agreement originally dated 20 April 1892 between BSAC and De Beers. That document essentially memorialised existing indebtedness of BSAC to De Beers and formalised those obligations into mortgage debentures, and increased the amount of the credit advanced to a total of £112,000. Subsequent amendments to the agreement ultimately extended that loan amount to £750,000. Crucially, a schedule to the agreement was attached with a single clause, described in the High Court as follows:

The plaintiff company shall grant to the defendant company exclusive licence to work all the plaintiff company's diamondiferous ground in the plaintiff company's territories south of the Zambesi...

The agreement was amended on 7 December 1892, and under clause 3 of that amendment, BSAC granted De Beers a floating charge over all of its assets. That charge was duly registered under local law. Further documents were entered into by the parties, but these were not germane to the legal issues in the case.

== High Court ==
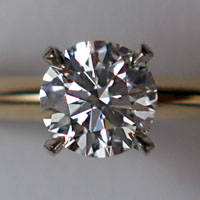
The dispute relating to diamond mining rights.

The matter came before Swinfen Eady J in the High Court. BSAC were represented by Richard Levett KC, and De Beers were represented by William Upjohn KC.

BSAC argued that the provision for exclusive mining rights was invalid on three separate grounds.

1. They argued, firstly, that under the company's charter it was specifically prohibited by granting any monopolies and that as such the purported grant of exclusive Diamond rights in perpetuity was ultra vires and void as being beyond the corporate powers of BSAC.
2. Secondly, they argued that the agreement between BSAC and De Beers was in the nature of a mortgage, and that as such the provision which granted an exclusive right to mine diamonds - even after the loan had been repaid and the mortgage discharged - amounted to a clog on the equity of redemption or otherwise was an unlawful collateral advantage. In response De Beers disputed that the agreement was beyond the powers of BSAC and noted that the agreement had been negotiated at arm's length between two substantial commercial parties. In relation to the specific point about the alleged clog on the equity of redemption, they argued that the clause relating to the mining rights was independent of the loan and mortgage, and they noted that the Cape Province was partly subject to Romano-Dutch law, which did not recognise the concept of the equity of redemption. Hence, as this was the lex situs of the mortgaged property, they argued there could be no equity of redemption to clog.
3. Thirdly, they argued in the alternative that the proper constructive of the clause in the schedule was that the licence to mine diamonds ceased upon repayment of all the indebtedness.

Swinfen Eady J reviewed the agreement and its amendments carefully before turning to the relevant legal issues.

In relation to the first point (regarding ultra vires), he was not satisfied that the exclusive licence did amount to a monopoly at law. But, in any event, he noted that the BSAC was a charter corporation and thus unlike a company registered under the Companies Acts, it was presumed to have all the capacity and powers of a natural person. Amongst other authorities, he cited the rule in the case of Sutton's Hospital (1612) 77 Eng Rep 960.

The court then had to consider which law governed the agreement. The agreement itself contained no choice of law clause, and the proper law had to be inferred from the intention of the parties and its terms. Swinfen Eady J concluded: "In my opinion both the contracts of April and December 1892, are English contracts, to be governed according to English law."

In relation to the second point he was satisfied that the stipulation relating to mining rights formed part and parcel of the wider mortgage agreement. Accordingly, the key issue was whether it represented an improper collateral advantage that fettered the right to redeem. Following various authorities, including Noakes v Rice [1902] AC 24 and Santley v Wilde [1899] 2 Ch 474, he held that it was a clog, and was thus invalid. He concluded: "In my opinion the agreement for the mining licence is invalid as offending against the maxim 'Once a mortgage always a mortgage, and nothing but a mortgage,' and as falling within the doctrine of a clog upon the equity of redemption."

== Court of Appeal ==
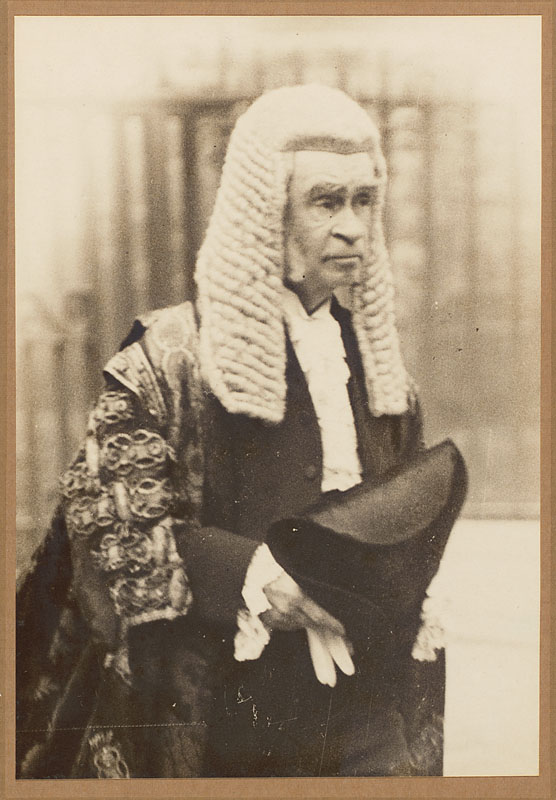
Lord Cozens-Hardy MR

De Beers appealed on the second point - whether or not the fact that the relevant provision was a clog on the equity of redemption under English law was relevant, given that the mortgaged property was located in another jurisdiction and under the English conflict of laws, was governed by the laws of that jurisdiction.

In the Court of Appeal the Master of the Rolls, Lord Cozens-Hardy, gave the first judgment. He began by affirming that the provision for the exclusive licence to mine diamonds was clearly part of the mortgage, and was not an independent stipulation. He also affirmed with respect to the governing law: "I think the proper law is English." The question then was whether the fact that the law of the place where the property located (Roman-Dutch law) did not recognise the concept of an equity of redemption precluded finding that the stipulation was a clog. He held that:

...if A. by an English contract agreed to give a mortgage to secure an English debt upon land in a foreign country, the law of which country does not recognize the existence of what we call an equity of redemption, which was the case of our common law, and if a mortgage was given and duly perfected according to the lex situs, I feel no doubt that our Courts would restrain the mortgagee from exercising the rights given by the foreign law and would treat the transaction in the sense in which that word is used by us. In doing this our Courts would not in any way interfere with the lex situs, but would by injunction, and if necessary by process of contempt, restrain the mortgagee from asserting those rights.

Farwell LJ gave a concurring judgment. He postulated the issue thus: "The sole question is, Is there a right to redeem?" He cited with authority ex parte Pollard (1840) Mont & Ch 239 at 250: "the courts of this country, in the exercise of their jurisdiction over contracts made here, or in administering equities between parties residing here, act upon their own rules, and are not influenced by any consideration of what the effect of such contracts might be in the country where the lands are situate, or of the manner in which the courts of such countries might deal with such equities". Accordingly, he held that the court could not allow the insertion of a clog which would defeat the equitable right to redeem.

Kennedy LJ also gave a concurring judgment. He accepted that the law of the foreign country would govern the title to land there, but "when an English Court has before it parties to a contract affecting immovables out of the jurisdiction, it will, acting in personam and not in rem, "upon the conscience," as it has been put, "of the person living here," when it finds an equitable right enforceable by a judgment in personam, give effect to that equitable right, and so indirectly affect the interests of the litigants in immovable property abroad." He cited Pollard and Lord Cranstown v Johnston (1796) 3 Ves 170, 30 ER 952 in support.

== House of Lords ==
De Beers then further appealed to the House of Lords. Before the House of Lords the BSAC added a new lead counsel to their legal team, Sir Robert Finlay KC. The case came before the House in July 1911, with their Lordships handing down their judgments on 4 December 1911.

The lead decision was given by Lord Atkinson, with whom all the other law lords (Earl Loreburn LC, Earl of Halsbury and Lord Gorell) agreed. Lord Atkinson reversed the Court of Appeal on different grounds, holdings that the agreement for an exclusive licence to mine diamonds in perpetuity was a separate and independent stipulation from the mortgage, and hence could not constitute a clog on the equity of redemption. Critically: the agreement imposed an immediate obligation to grant the licence, but there was no immediate obligation to issue any debentures, hence the licence was not in their view part of the mortgage transaction. They noted that the debentures were issued long after the agreement, and the licence had continued long after they had been repaid. Their Lordships also queried (but did not decide) whether the doctrine of clogs applied to a floating charge.

However their Lordships did not disturb the findings of the courts below that (i) the purported grant of an exclusive monopoly was not ultra vires, and (ii) that a clog could arise under an English law security agreement even if the lex situs of the mortgaged property did not recognise the concept of an equity of redemption.

== Reception ==
The decision has broadly been accepted and applied by the English courts with respect to the equitable rights between the parties with respect to security over land (and other property) overseas. In Dubai Islamic Bank PJSC v PSI Energy Holding Company BSC [2013] EWHC 3186 (Comm) Flaux J, citing the case, held (at [23]) that: "an English law contract to mortgage or charge foreign land takes effect in England as an English mortgage or charge, with all the rights and liabilities attached to such a mortgage or charge, even if the foreign law does not recognise the equity of redemption or the validity of the security interest created."

Academically, the case remains cited as good authority by both leading textbooks in the conflict of laws, and in equity.
