= Credit River, Minnesota =

Credit River
- City
- Location of the city of Credit River within Scott County, Minnesota
- Coordinates: 44°40′26″N 93°21′32″W
- Country: United States
- State: Minnesota
- County: Scott
- Founded: 1858
- Incorporated: May 11, 2021

Government
  - Mayor: Chris Kostik
  - Councilmember: Brent Lawrence; Leroy Schommer; Jay Saterbak; Abe Zanto

Area
  - Total: 23.8 sq mi (61.6 km^{2})
  - Land: 23.4 sq mi (60.5 km^{2})
  - Water: 0.43 sq mi (1.11 km^{2})
- Elevation: 935 ft (285 m)

Population (2020)
  - Total: 5,493
  - Estimate (2022): 5,546
  - Density: 218.2/sq mi (84.23/km^{2})
- Time zone: UTC-6 (Central)
  - Summer (DST): UTC-5 (CDT)
- ZIP codes: 55044, 55372
- Area code: 952
- FIPS code: 27-13726
- GNIS feature ID: 2830139
- Website: creditriver-mn.gov

Credit River is a city in Scott County, Minnesota, United States. The population was 5,493 at the 2020 census.

== History ==
The former Credit River Township was organized in 1858. The Credit River flows northward through the city. In 2021, it was announced that the township would incorporate as the City of Credit River, following an administrative judge's ruling allowing the incorporation to move forward. The ascension of Credit River to incorporated city status is the first in Minnesota since 2015. Credit River incorporated as a city on May 11, 2021.

== Geography ==
According to the United States Census Bureau, the city has an area of 23.77 square miles (61.6 km^{2}), of which 23.37 square miles (60.5 km^{2}) is land and 0.4 square miles (1.1 km2; 1.72%) is water.

== Demographics ==
Historical population
Census	Pop.	Note	%±
1860	129		—
1870	448		247.3%
1880	383		−14.5%
1890	347		−9.4%
1900	455		31.1%
1910	446		−2.0%
1920	446		0.0%
1930	399		−10.5%
1940	348		−12.8%
1950	393		12.9%
1960	439		11.7%
1970	1,165		165.4%
1980	2,360		102.6%
1990	2,854		20.9%
2000	3,895		36.5%
2010	5,096		30.8%
2020	5,493		7.8%
2022 (est.)	5,546		1.0%
U.S. Decennial Census; 2020 Census

=== 2020 census ===
As of the census of 2020, there were 5,493 people, 1,842 households.

=== 2010 census ===
As of the census of 2010, there were 5,096 people.

=== 2000 census ===
As of the census of 2000, there were 3,895 people, 1,242 households, and 1,105 families residing in the township. The population density was 166.1 inhabitants per square mile (64.1/km^{2}). There were 1,252 housing units at an average density of 53.4/sq mi (20.6/km^{2}). The racial makeup of the township was 98.18% White, 0.28% African American, 0.28% Native American, 0.74% Asian, 0.10% from other races, and 0.41% from two or more races. Hispanic or Latino of any race were 0.56% of the population.

There were 1,242 households, out of which 48.3% had children under the age of 18 living with them, 81.7% were married couples living together, 3.7% had a female householder with no husband present, and 11.0% were non-families. 7.7% of all households were made up of individuals, and 1.0% had someone living alone who was 65 years of age or older. The average household size was 3.13 and the average family size was 3.29.

In the township the population was spread out, with 31.6% under the age of 18, 6.0% from 18 to 24, 31.0% from 25 to 44, 27.4% from 45 to 64, and 4.0% who were 65 years of age or older. The median age was 37 years. For every 100 females, there were 103.2 males. For every 100 females age 18 and over, there were 106.7 males.

The median income for a household in the township was $78,501, and the median income for a family was $79,852. Males had a median income of $55,739 versus $38,000 for females. The per capita income for the township was $29,567. About 2.2% of families and 3.1% of the population were below the poverty line, including 5.7% of those under age 18 and 2.6% of those age 65 or over.

== See also ==
- Credit River Case – a court case named after this former township
