= Drive-by inspection =

Act of property assessment

Drive-by inspection is a quick assessment of a property. Drive-by inspection, or quick property assessment of properties are performed to assess a real estate property, such as of by field investigators for out-of-town landlords of rental property. Drive-by inspection services are primarily used by financial institutions in the case of foreclosure and require foreclosure property preservation and bank foreclosure inspection services and specialists.

== Foreclosure ==
Drive-by inspection process includes:

- Property assessment, upgrades and improvements – the property is inspected by a professional which inspects based upon a report verifying that all given financial funds and resources where utilized solely for home improvement.
- Investigation and verification – is done to confirmed the property address, determine neighborhood condition and value of properties, and capture a photographic record of property interior and exterior.
- Legalization
- Implementation of methods and procedures are enforced by:
  - Fair Debt Collection Practices Act
  - Fair Credit Reporting Act
  - Health Insurance Portability and Accountability Act
