= Lord Cranstown v Johnston =

English conflict of laws case

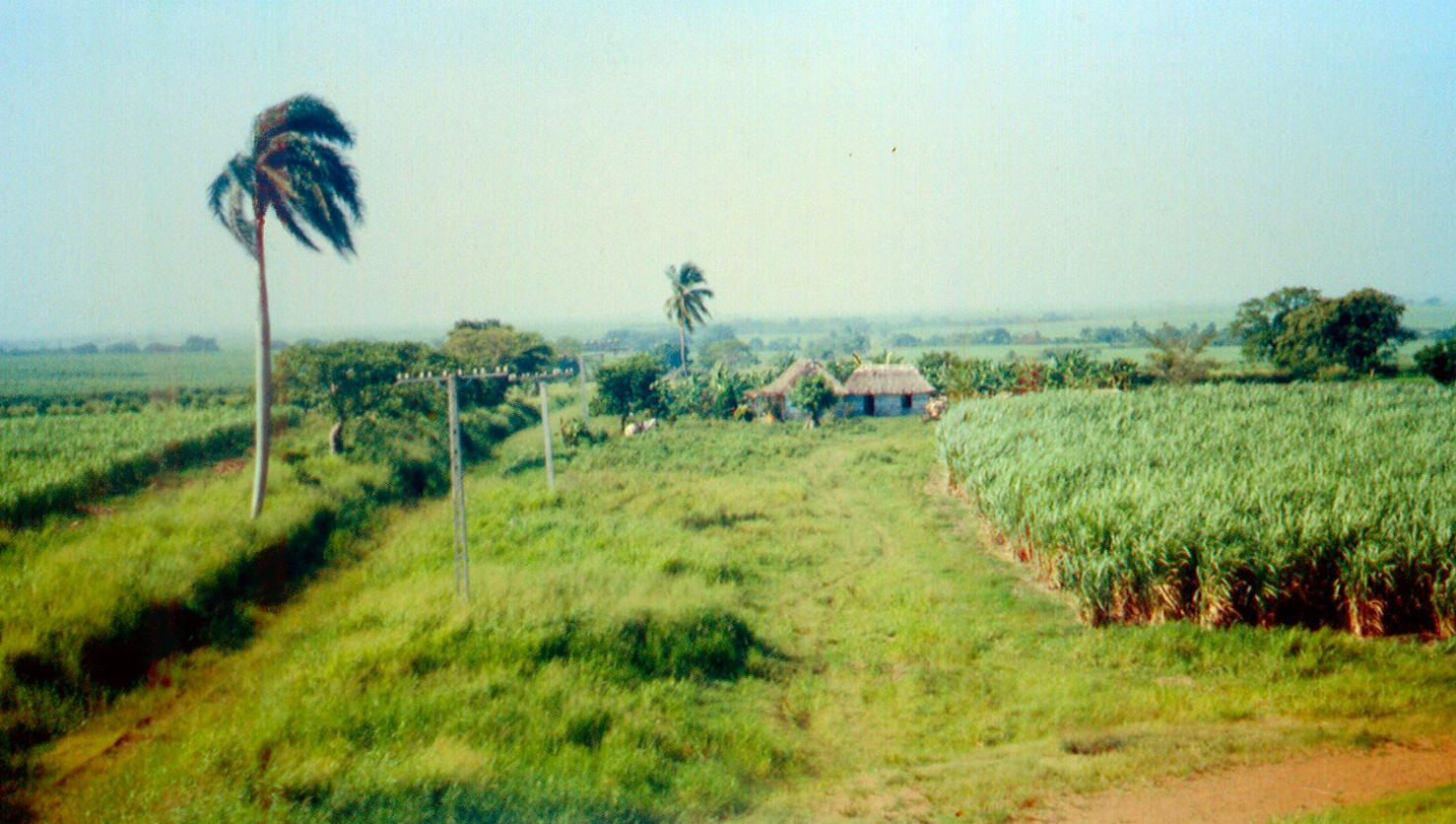
- The dispute centred around a plantation in the Caribbean
- Court: High Court
- Decided: 5 July 1796
- Citations: (1796) 3 Ves 170; 30 ER 952
- Transcript: CommonLII

Court membership
- Judge sitting: Sir Richard Arden MR

Keywords
- abuse of process; conflict of laws; mortgages; in personam jurisdiction

Lord Cranstown v Johnson (1796) 3 Ves 170, 30 ER 952 is a judicial decision of the English courts relating to the conflict of laws and the ability of the court to exercise personal (or, in personam) jurisdiction over the litigants to compel them to deal with land which is located outside of the jurisdiction of the court.

Lord Cranstown owed money to Johnson, although there was a disagreement between them as to how much was owed. Although the parties were discussing the matter, whilst the discussions were ongoing Johnson started proceedings on the island of St Kitts to seek an order of the court for the sale of a valuable estate belonging to Lord Cranston. Under the laws in St Kitts it was permissible to commence such an action by substituted service by nailing the writ to the courthouse door. Lord Cranston was not aware of the proceedings, and so the court proceeded to make an order for the sale of the estate, which Johnson purchased (as the only bidder) for a fraction of its true worth. When he discovered what had happened, Lord Cranstown sued Johnson in the English courts, and sought an order that Johnson return his estates to him.

Even though the land in question was located outside of the jurisdiction of the court, it nonetheless ordered Johnson to reconvey the estate to Lord Cranstown, holding "this Court cannot act upon the [foreign] land directly, but acts upon the conscience of the person living here."

== Facts ==
Lord Cranstown was the owner of a plantation on the island of St Kitts in the Caribbean. He owed the defendant Johnston a little over £2,500. The pair had been in discussions in England in relation to the debt. Whilst the discussion were ongoing, Johnston issued proceedings in St Kitts suing for the debt. Under the laws of St Kitts it was permitted to serve proceedings on a defendant by way of substituted service by nailing the writ on a post and upon the door of the court. Lord Cranstown received no notice of the proceedings, and judgment was given in favour of Johnson by default. Lord Cranstown's estate in St Kitts was put up for auction to satisfy the judgment, and at the auction Johnston was the only bidder. He purchased the plantation for £2,000 by way of credit bid. This was considerably less than the true value of the estate, which the court held could not be worth less than £20,000 at a minimum. When he discovered what had happened Lord Cranstown brought suit in England to recover the estate.

== High Court ==
The case came before the Master of the Rolls, Sir Richard Arden.

The Master of the Rolls held that, even though Johnston had made no false representation to anyone, and he had not violated any law of St Kitts, and nor did he owe any contractual obligations to Lord Cranstown, nonetheless he did know that he was going behind Lord Cranstown's back and in doing so was contriving to get the estate for a fraction of its true worth. He could not question the jurisdiction of the foreign court to deal with land in St Kitts, or the regularity of its proceedings. However he was satisfied that it was a fraud all the same according to English rules of equity, and that because Johnson was within the jurisdiction of the court he was able to order him to restore the estate upon being repaid the original debt and expenses owed by Lord Cranstoun.

He accepted this general principle:

this Court cannot act upon the land directly, but acts upon the conscience of the person living here. [cites cases] Those cases clearly shew, that with regard to any contract made or equity between persons in this country respecting lands in a foreign country, particularly in the British dominions, this Court will hold the same jurisdiction as if they were situated in England. ...
Therefore without affecting the jurisdiction of the Courts there, or questioning the regularity of the proceedings in a Court of law, or saying that this sale would have been set aside either in law or equity there ... neither the law of this nor of any other country would permit...

He held:

I will lay down a rule as broad as this: this Court will not permit him to avail himself of the law of any other country to do what would be a gross injustice.

== Commentary ==
The case has been cited with approval in numerous cases, both in England and abroad. It was cited with approval by the English courts in British South Africa Company v De Beers Consolidated Mines Ltd [1910] 2 Ch 502, Deschamps v Miller [1908] 1 Ch 856, Mercantile Investment Co v River Plate Trust Co [1892] 2 Ch 303, Re Courtney, ex p Pollard (1840) Mont & Ch 239, [1835-42] All ER Rep 415 and Norris v Chambers (1861) 29 Beav 246, 54 ER 621, and by the House of Lords in British South Africa Company v Companhia de Moçambique [1893] AC 602.

It was recently cited by the High Court in R Griggs Group Ltd v Evans [2004] EWHC 1088 (Ch).

The leading textbooks on the English conflict of laws treat it as authoritative with respect to the fact the court may exercise in personam jurisdiction over a litigant with respect to land situated abroad, even though it cannot make an order in relation to the land itself.

It has also been cited with approval by the Supreme Court of Canada in Duke v Adler [1932] 4 DLR 529.

== Notes ==
Lord Cranstoun himself died within a few months of the decision, and his widow died a few months after that. There appears to be no extant record of whether he did ever discharge the debt to Johnson, and so whether Johnson did reconvey the estate to his widow or heirs.
