= Mortgage law =

Legal mechanisms used to secure the performance of obligations

A mortgage is a legal instrument of the common law which is used to create a security interest in real property held by a lender as a security for a debt, usually a mortgage loan. Hypothec is the corresponding term in civil law jurisdictions, albeit with a wider sense, as it also covers non-possessory lien.

A mortgage in itself is not a debt, it is the lender's security for a debt. It is a transfer of an interest in land (or the equivalent) from the owner to the mortgage lender, on the condition that this interest will be returned to the owner when the terms of the mortgage have been satisfied or performed. In other words, the mortgage is a security for the loan that the lender makes to the borrower.

The word is a Law French term meaning "dead pledge," originally only referring to the Welsh mortgage (see below), but in the later Middle Ages was applied to all gages and reinterpreted by folk etymology to mean that the pledge ends (dies) either when the obligation is fulfilled or the property is taken through foreclosure.

In most jurisdictions mortgages are strongly associated with loans secured on real estate rather than on other property (such as ships) and in some jurisdictions only land may be mortgaged. A mortgage is the standard method by which individuals and businesses can purchase real estate without the need to pay the full value immediately from their own resources. See mortgage loan for residential mortgage lending, and commercial mortgage for lending against commercial property.

== Participants and variant terminology ==
Legal systems in different countries, while having some concepts in common, employ different terminology. However, in general, a mortgage of property involves the following parties. The borrower, known as the mortgagor, gives the mortgage to the lender, known as the mortgagee.

=== Lender/mortgagee ===
A mortgage lender is an investor that lends money secured by a mortgage on real estate. In today's world, most lenders sell the loans they write on the secondary mortgage market. When they sell the mortgage, they earn revenue called Service Release Premium. Typically, the purpose of the loan is for the borrower to purchase that same real estate. As the mortgagee, the lender has the right to sell the property to pay off the loan if the borrower fails to pay.

The mortgage runs with the land, so even if the borrower transfers the property to someone else, the mortgagee still has the right to sell it if the borrower fails to pay off the loan.

So that a buyer cannot unwittingly buy property subject to a mortgage, mortgages are registered or recorded against the title with a government office, as a public record. The borrower has the right to have the mortgage discharged from the title once the debt is paid.

=== Borrower/mortgagor ===
A mortgagor is the borrower in a mortgage—he or she owes the obligation secured by the mortgage. Generally, the borrower must meet the conditions of the underlying loan or other obligation in order to redeem the mortgage. If the borrower fails to meet these conditions, the mortgagee may foreclose to recover the outstanding loan. Typically the borrowers will be the individual homeowners, landlords, or businesses who are purchasing their property by way of a loan.

=== Other participants ===
Because of the complicated legal exchange, or conveyance, of the property, one or both of the main participants are likely to require legal representation. The agent used for conveyancing varies based on the jurisdiction. In the English-speaking world this means either a general legal practitioner, i.e., an attorney or solicitor, or in jurisdictions influenced by English law, including South Africa, a (licensed) conveyancer. In the United States, real estate agents are the most common. In civil law jurisdictions conveyancing is handled by civil law notaries.

Because of the complex nature of many markets the borrower may approach a mortgage broker or financial adviser to help him or her source an appropriate lender, typically by finding the most competitive loan.

The debt instrument is, in civil law jurisdictions, referred to by some form of Latin hypotheca (e.g., Sp hipoteca, Fr hypothèque, Germ Hypothek), and the parties are known as hypothecator (borrower) and hypothecatee (lender). A civil-law hypotheca is exactly equivalent to an English mortgage by legal charge or American lien-theory mortgage.

== History ==
=== Anglo-Saxon and Anglo-Norman law ===
In Anglo-Saxon England, when interest loans were illegal, the main method of securing realty was by wadset (ME wedset). A wadset was a loan masked as a sale of land under right of reversion. The borrower (reverser) conveyed by charter a fee simple estate, in consideration of a loan, to the lender (wadsetter) who on redemption would reconvey the estate to the reverser by a second charter. The difficulty with this arrangement was that the wadsetter was absolute owner of the property and could sell it to a third party or refuse to reconvey it to the reverser, who was also stripped of his principal means of repayment and therefore in a weak position. In later years the practice—especially in Scotland and on the continent—was to execute together the wadset and a separate back-bond according the reverser an in personam right of reverter.

An alternative practice imported from Norman law was the usufructory pledge of real property known as a gage of land. Under a gage the borrower (gagor) conveyed possession but not ownership to the lender (gagee) for an unlimited term until redemption. The gage came in two forms:

- the living gage (Norman vif gage, Welsh prid), whereby the estate's accruing rents, profits, and crops went toward reducing the debt (that is, the debt was self-redeeming);
- the dead gage (Norman mort gage, Scots deid wad), whereby the rents and profits were taken in lieu of interest but did not reduce the debt.

The gage was unattractive for lenders because the gagor could easily eject the gagee using novel disseisin, and the gagee—merely seized ut de vadio “as of gage”—could not bring a freeholder's remedies to recover possession. Thus, the unprofitable living gage fell out of use, but the dead gage continued as the Welsh mortgage until abolished in 1922.

=== Late Middle Ages ===
By the 13th century—in England and on the continent—the gage was limited to a term of years and contained a forfeiture proviso (pactum commissorium) providing that if after the term the debt was not repaid, title was forfeited to the lender, i.e., the term of years would expand automatically into a fee simple. This is known as a shifting fee and was sufficient after 1199 to entitle the gagee to bring an action for recovery. However, the royal courts increasingly did not respect shifting fees since there was no livery of seisin (i.e., no formal conveyance), nor did they recognize that tenure could be enlarged, so by the 14th century the simple gage for years was invalid in England (and Scotland and the near continent).

The solution was to merge the latter-day wadset and gage for years into a single transaction embodied in two instruments: (1) the absolute conveyance (the charter) in fee or for years to the lender; (2) an indenture or bond (the defeasance) reciting the loan and providing that if it was repaid the land would reinvest in the borrower, but if not the lender would retain title. If repaid on time, the lender would reinvest title using a reconveyance deed. This was the mortgage by conveyance (aka mortgage in fee) or, when written, the mortgage by charter and reconveyance and took the form of a feoffment, bargain and sale, or lease and release. Since the lender did not necessarily enter into possession, had rights of action, and covenanted a right of reversion on the borrower, the mortgage was a proper collateral security. Thus, a mortgage was on its face an absolute conveyance of a fee simple estate, but was in fact conditional, and would be of no effect if certain conditions were met.

The debt was absolute in form, and unlike a gage was not conditionally dependent on its repayment solely from raising and selling crops or livestock or simply giving the crops and livestock raised on the gaged land. The mortgage debt remained in effect whether or not the land could successfully produce enough income to repay the debt. In theory, a mortgage required no further steps to be taken by the lender, such as acceptance of crops and livestock in repayment.

=== Renaissance and after ===
However, if the borrower was a single day late in repaying the debt, he forfeited his land to the lender while still remaining liable for the debt. Increasingly the courts of equity began to protect the borrower's interests, so that a borrower came to have under Sir Francis Bacon (1617–21) an absolute right to insist on reconveyance on redemption even if past due. This right of the borrower is known as the equity of redemption.

This arrangement, whereby the lender was in theory the absolute owner, but in practice had few of the practical rights of ownership, was seen in many jurisdictions as being awkwardly artificial. By statute the common law's position was altered so that the mortgagor (borrower) would retain ownership, but the mortgagee's (lender's) rights, such as foreclosure, the power of sale, and the right to take possession, would be protected. In the United States, those states that have reformed the nature of mortgages in this way are known as lien states. A similar effect was achieved in England and Wales by the Law of Property Act 1925, which abolished mortgages by the conveyance of a fee simple.

Since the 17th century, lenders have not been allowed to carry interest in the property beyond the underlying debt under the equity of redemption principle. Attempts by the lender to carry an equity interest in the property in a manner similar to convertible bonds through contract have been therefore struck down by courts as "clogs", but developments in the 1980s and 1990s have led to less rigid enforcement of this principle, particularly due to interest among theorists in returning to a freedom of contract regime.

=== Mortgage Law and Colonization Practices ===
Mortgage and foreclosure were used as a means by the Dutch and other colonists to acquire land from native peoples in North America. This was a successful endeavor partially due to cultural differences in the understanding of land ownership. The practice followed a series of steps. Colonists would draw native peoples into their debts through credit that the natives would then need to create mortgages to repay. The debt would generally be one that the natives would be unable to pay in a reasonable time frame and thus foreclosure would be enforced, and the land acquired by the colonists.

== Default on divided property ==
When a tract of land is purchased with a mortgage and then split up and sold, the "inverse order of alienation rule" applies to decide parties liable for the unpaid debt.

When a mortgaged tract of land is split up and sold, upon default, the mortgagee first forecloses on lands still owned by the mortgagor and proceeds against other owners in an 'inverse order' in which they were sold. For example, Alice acquires a 3-acre (12,000 m^{2}) lot by mortgage then splits up the lot into three 1-acre (4,000 m^{2}) lots (X, Y, and Z), and sells lot Y to Bob, and then lot Z to Charlie, retaining lot X for herself. Upon default, the mortgagee proceeds against lot X first, the mortgagor. If foreclosure or repossession of lot X does not fully satisfy the debt, the mortgagee proceeds against lot Z (Charlie), then lot Y (Bob). The rationale is that the first purchaser should have more equity and subsequent purchasers receive a diluted share.

== Legal aspects ==
Mortgages may be legal or equitable. Furthermore, a mortgage may take one of a number of different legal structures, the availability of which will depend on the jurisdiction under which the mortgage is made. Common law jurisdictions have evolved two main forms of mortgage: the mortgage by demise and the mortgage by legal charge.

=== Mortgage by demise ===
In a mortgage by demise, the mortgagee (the lender) becomes the owner of the mortgaged property until the loan is repaid or other mortgage obligation fulfilled in full, a process known as "redemption". This kind of mortgage takes the form of a conveyance of the property to the creditor, with a condition that the property will be returned on redemption.

Mortgages by demise were the original form of mortgage, and continue to be used in many jurisdictions, and in a small minority of states in the United States. Many other common law jurisdictions have either abolished or minimised the use of the mortgage by demise. For example, in England and Wales this type of mortgage is no longer available in relation to registered interests in land, by virtue of section 23 of the Land Registration Act 2002 (though it continues to be available for unregistered interests).

=== Mortgage by legal charge ===
In a mortgage by legal charge or technically "a charge by deed expressed to be by way of legal mortgage", the debtor remains the legal owner of the property, but the creditor gains sufficient rights over it to enable them to enforce their security, such as a right to take possession of the property or sell it.

To protect the lender, a mortgage by legal charge is usually recorded in a public register. Since mortgage debt is often the largest debt owed by the debtor, banks and other mortgage lenders run title searches of the real estate property to make certain that there are no mortgages already registered on the debtor's property which might have higher priority. Tax liens, in some cases, will come ahead of mortgages. For this reason, if a borrower has delinquent property taxes, the bank will often pay them to prevent the lienholder from foreclosing and wiping out the mortgage.

This type of mortgage is most common in the United States and, since the Law of Property Act 1925, it has been the usual form of mortgage in England and Wales (it is now the only form for registered interests in land – see above).

In Scotland, the mortgage by legal charge is also known as Standard Security.

In Pakistan, the mortgage by legal charge is most common way used by banks to secure the financing. It is also known as registered mortgage. After registration of legal charge, the bank's lien is recorded in the land register stating that the property is under mortgage and cannot be sold without obtaining an NOC (No Objection Certificate) from the bank.

=== Equitable mortgage ===
Equitable mortgages originate in English Common Law and may lack some legal formalities.

In an equitable mortgage the lender is secured by taking possession of all the original title documents of the property and by borrower's signing a Memorandum of Deposit of Title Deed (MODTD). This document is an undertaking by the borrower that he/she has deposited the title documents with the bank with his own wish and will, in order to secure the financing obtained from the bank. Certain transactions are recognized therefore as mortgages by equity, which are not so recognized by common law.

== Foreclosure and non-recourse lending ==
In most jurisdictions, a lender may foreclose on the mortgaged property if certain conditions—principally, non-payment of the mortgage loan – apply. A foreclosure will be either judicial or extrajudicial (non-judicial), depending upon whether the jurisdiction within which the property to be foreclosed interprets mortgages according to title theory or lien theory, and further depending upon the type of security instrument used to secure the loan. Subject to local legal requirements, the property may then be sold. Any amounts received from the sale (net of costs) are applied to the original debt.

In some jurisdictions mainly in the United States, mortgage loans are non-recourse loans: if the funds recouped from sale of the mortgaged property are insufficient to cover the outstanding debt, the lender may not have recourse to the borrower after foreclosure. In other jurisdictions, the borrower remains responsible for any remaining debt, through a deficiency judgment. In some jurisdictions, first mortgages are non-recourse loans, but second and subsequent ones are recourse loans.

Specific procedures for foreclosure and sale of the mortgaged property almost always apply, and may be tightly regulated by the relevant government. In some jurisdictions, foreclosure and sale can occur quite rapidly, while in others, foreclosure may take many months or even years. In many countries, the ability of lenders to foreclose is extremely limited, and mortgage market development has been notably slower. The relatively slow, expensive and cumbersome process of judicial foreclosure is a primary motivation for the use of deeds of trust, because of their provisions for non-judicial foreclosures by trustees through "power of sale" clauses.

== Mortgages in the United States ==
=== Three theories of mortgages ===
There are three legal theories pertaining to mortgages: title theory, lien theory, and intermediate theory. These three theories pertain particularly to the operation of mortgages, and so provide the key to understanding the differences which exist in the operation of mortgages across jurisdictions.

==== Title theory ====
Title theory is "the idea that a mortgage transfers legal title of the mortgaged property from the mortgagor to the mortgagee, which retains it until the mortgage has been satisfied or foreclosed. Only a few American States...have adopted this theory." Under title theory, a mortgage has the effect of a deed passing legal title, though conditionally, of the mortgaged property to the mortgagee (the lender in a loan agreement being secured by the mortgage), with so-called "equitable title" (which is really equity of redemption) being retained by the mortgagor (the borrower in the loan). The fact of the mortgagor's retaining of the "equity of redemption" is the fact which renders the passing of title under title theory conditional. Mortgages within title theory jurisdictions, then, may be viewed as having the action of what might be called "conditional deeds". Though legal title is passed pursuant to a mortgage therein, the arrangement is generally construed by courts to recognize the mortgagor as "owner" of the mortgaged property within title theory jurisdictions. Even so, foreclosure of the property as a remedy for default under title theory is most often extrajudicial (non-judicial).

==== Lien theory ====
Lien theory is "the idea that a mortgage resembles a lien, so that...", pursuant to a mortgage, "...the mortgagee acquires only a lien on the property and the mortgagor retains both legal and equitable title unless a valid foreclosure occurs. Most American states...have adopted this theory." Sometimes this theory is referred to as the "Equitable Theory of Mortgages". Under lien theory. a mortgage acts to place a lien on the mortgaged property in favor of the mortgagee, and legal title is retained by the mortgagor. Judicial foreclosure is most often necessary as a remedy to default pursuant to mortgages within lien theory jurisdictions, and this process has been found to be cumbersome, time-consuming and costly. Resultantly, lenders within lien theory jurisdictions most often have recourse to non-mortgage instruments for the securement of loans, which instruments usually take the form of trust deeds or, within the State of Georgia, the security deed. Deeds always act to convey legal title to a parcel of real property, and the ubiquitous usage of such deeds within lien theory jurisdictions has generally served to subvert the action of mortgages therein.

==== Intermediate theory ====
Under what has come to be called the "intermediate theory" of mortgages, a mortgage is viewed as creating a lien on the mortgaged property until such a time as an event of default occurs pursuant to the loan contract. After such a time, the same mortgage is construed under title theory. This is accomplished by the inclusion of a stipulation within the loan contract to the effect that the borrower is allowed to retain legal title to the collateralized property with the express agreement that the lender may foreclose in a non- or extrajudicial manner if the borrower defaults on the loan.

In the United States, more states are lien-theory states than are title-theory or intermediate-theory states. In title-theory states, a mortgage continues to be a conveyance of legal title to secure a debt, while the mortgagor still retains equitable title. In lien-theory states, mortgages and deeds of trust have been redesigned so that they now impose a nonpossessory lien on the title to the mortgaged property, while the mortgagor still holds both legal and equitable title.

=== Types of security interests in realty ===
Four types of security over real property are commonly used in the United States: the title mortgage, the lien mortgage, the deed of trust, and particularly within the State of Georgia, the security deed. In the United States, these security instruments proceed off of debt instruments drawn up in the form of promissory notes and which are known variously as mortgage notes, lender's notes, or real estate lien notes.

==== The mortgage ====
A mortgage operates to collateralize real property by means of lien or through conditional conveyance of title, depending upon jurisdiction. A mortgage creates a security interest in realty created by a written instrument (traditionally a deed) that either conveys legal title (according to the "title theory of mortgages") or hypothecates title by way of a nonpossessory lien (according to the "lien theory of mortgages") to a lender for the performance under the terms of a mortgage note. In slightly less than half of states, a mortgage creates a lien on the title to the mortgaged property. Foreclosure of that lien almost always requires a judicial proceeding declaring the debt to be due and in default and ordering a sale of the property to pay the debt. Many mortgages contain a power of sale clause, also known as nonjudicial foreclosure clause, making them equivalent to a deed of trust. Most "mortgages" in California are actually deeds of trust. The effective difference is that the foreclosure process can be much faster for a deed of trust than for a mortgage, on the order of 3 months rather than a year. Because this foreclosure does not require actions by the court, the transaction costs can be quite a bit less.

==== The deed of trust ====
The deed of trust is a conveyance of title made by the borrower to a third party trustee (not the lender) for the purposes of securing a debt. In lien-theory states, it is reinterpreted as merely imposing a lien on the title and not a title transfer, regardless of its terms. It differs from a mortgage in that, in many states, it can be foreclosed by a nonjudicial sale held by the trustee through a power of sale. It is also possible to foreclose them through a judicial proceeding.

Deeds of trust to secure repayments of debts should not be confused with trust instruments that are sometimes called deeds of trust but that are used to create trusts for other purposes, such as estate planning. Though there are superficial similarities in the form, many states hold deeds of trust to secure repayment of debts do not create true trust arrangements.

==== The security deed: specialty of Georgia ====
Georgia is often stated to be a title theory state, but such is not the case. Note O.C.G.A. §44-14-30, which states clearly that "A mortgage in this state is only security for a debt and passes no title." Also note O.C.G.A. §44-14-31, which states that "No particular form is necessary to constitute a mortgage. However, a mortgage must clearly indicate the creation of a lien and must specify the debt for which it is given and the property upon which it is to take effect." It is clear, then, that mortgages are construed within the Official Georgia Code and by the Courts of the State of Georgia as placing a lien upon a mortgaged property in favor of the mortgagee, while the mortgagor retains both legal and equitable title to that property. It is equally clear, then, that Georgia is, by virtue of the foregoing facts, a lien theory state. Even so, the Georgia Legislature has formally provided for a lender being able to secure its loan by means of having legal title to a collateralized property conveyed to it.

The so-called "Deed to Secure Debt" is a security instrument used in the state of Georgia to accomplish securing of a debt by means of the passing of legal title to real property. Though it is characterized within the Official Code of Georgia (the "O.C.G.A.") to be an "absolute conveyance" of title, it is, in fact, not, for the grantor of the deed in this scheme does retain the "equity of redemption", otherwise known as "equitable title". The nature of the Georgia "Deed to Secure Debt" is set forth in O.C.G.A. §44-14-60, within which (somewhat oxymoronically) it is stated that: "Such conveyance shall be held by the courts to be an absolute conveyance,..." (assumedly meaning an actual conveyance of "absolute" or "perfect" title to the grantee) "...with the right reserved by the grantor to have the property reconveyed to him upon the payment of the debt or debts intended to be secured agreeably to the terms of the contract,..." (in other words, the grantor retains "equitable title", a.k.a. the equity of redemption, which appears to contradict the preceding phrase within the same sentence) "...and shall not be held to be a mortgage." (which is true, but only within a "lien theory" jurisdiction). Despite the assertion within the O.C.G.A. of "absolute conveyance", the fact that the grantor of a security deed retains equitable title to the deeded property, means that the conveyance of title effected by said security deed is, in fact, not absolute, but is conditional, and the security deed effectively functions as a mortgage construed under title theory.

Upon the execution of such a deed, "legal title" passes to the grantee or beneficiary (usually lender), while the grantor (borrower) maintains "equitable title" to use and enjoy the conveyed land subject to compliance with debt obligations. In this, the security deed in Georgia operates no differently than does a mortgage within "title theory" jurisdictions. Hypothetically, if "absolute" or "perfect" title were held by a grantee such that the grantor did not retain the equity of redemption, then the grantee/lender would theoretically not have need to foreclose upon the grantor/borrower, but rather might cure a default by simple means of eviction or "summary reposession". However, foreclosure, albeit extrajudicial, is found to be necessary in Georgia to cure a default. Because of the apparently self-contradictory nature of the Georgia statute, the Courts within Georgia have construed the operation of security deeds to mean that the grantor retains the equity of redemption, such that non- or extrajudicial foreclosure is necessary as a remedy for default on a loan.

In order to be effectual, security deeds must be recorded in the county of Georgia within which the land is located. Although there is no specific time within which such deeds must be filed, the failure to timely record the deed to secure debt may affect priority and therefore the ability to enforce the debt against the subject property.

==== Priority ====
The lien is said to attach to the title when the mortgage is signed by the mortgagor and delivered to the mortgagee and the mortgagor receives the funds whose repayment the mortgage secures. Subject to the requirements of the recording laws of the state in which the mortgaged property is located, this attachment establishes the priority of the mortgage lien with respect to most other liens on the property's title. Liens that have attached to the title before the mortgage lien are said to be senior to, or prior to, the mortgage lien. Those attaching afterward are said to be junior or subordinate. The purpose of this priority is to establish the order in which lienholders are entitled to foreclose their liens in order to recover their debts. If a property's title has multiple mortgage liens and the loan secured by a first mortgage is paid off, the second mortgage lien will move up in priority and become the new first mortgage lien on the title. Documenting this new priority arrangement will require the release of the mortgage securing the paid-off loan.

== Assignment ==
Mortgages, along with the Mortgage note, may be assigned to other parties. Some jurisdictions hold that the assignment of the note implies the assignment of the mortgage, while others contend it only creates an equitable right.

== See also ==
- Bridge financing
- Collateralized mortgage obligation - CMO
- Conditional dismissal
- Financing
- Fixed-rate mortgage
- Foreign currency mortgage
- Hypothec
- Loan origination
- Loan servicing
- Mortgage calculator
- Mortgage Credit Directive
- Mortgage insurance
- MortgageLoan
- National Mortgage News
- Promissory note
- Refinancing
- Second mortgage
- Subprime lending
- Subprime mortgage crisis
- Trust deed
