= Foreclosure stripping =

Removing fixtures from a foreclosed property

Foreclosure stripping is the process in which the owners of a foreclosed property will remove fixtures and fittings from the property in an attempt to salvage some of their investment. Malicious foreclosure stripping is done by home owners who render damage throughout the property to significantly decrease its value and cause the foreclosing bank to accept a lower price when it is resold. Foreclosure stripping has been a growing trend since the 2000s and especially became an issue during the subprime mortgage crisis of 2007–2010.

== Problems with foreclosure stripping ==
A large societal problem associated with foreclosure stripping is devaluation of property in the local area. Because homes are being sold as incomplete, the prices are much lower than others in the area, which brings down the local average property value. Foreclosure stripping is also a problem for banks, as mortgage are unavailable on incomplete properties meaning that for resale to occur, a cash buyer is necessary.

== Penalties of foreclosure stripping ==
Foreclosure stripping is considered a crime in most states. It goes against the terms of the foreclosure deed signed by the home owner, although some would argue that the home remains with the owner until the date at which it is officially signed over to the bank.

In the past banks have just recovered the cost of the damage from their insurance brokers, and the perpetrators have never been prosecuted. But recent cases have seen thieves convicted of burglary, a class 4 felony. US states such as Arizona have their own FBI task force to investigate and arrest those guilty of property stripping.

== Items that legally must remain with the foreclosed home ==
Any item that is a built-in feature of the home must remain intact. This includes:

- Built-in appliances such as stovetops and dishwashers
- Cabinets, shelving and countertops throughout the property
- Built-in air-conditioning units and furnaces
- Plumbing and copper pipes
- Electrical wiring and fixtures including outlets, lighting and ceiling fans
- Doors and associated hardware
- Flooring, including tiles, carpets and decking
- Windows and vents
- Sinks, tubs, toilets, showers and associated hardware
- Landscaping and fencing
- Built-in pools and spas
