= Foreclosure =

Legal process where a lender recoups an unpaid loan

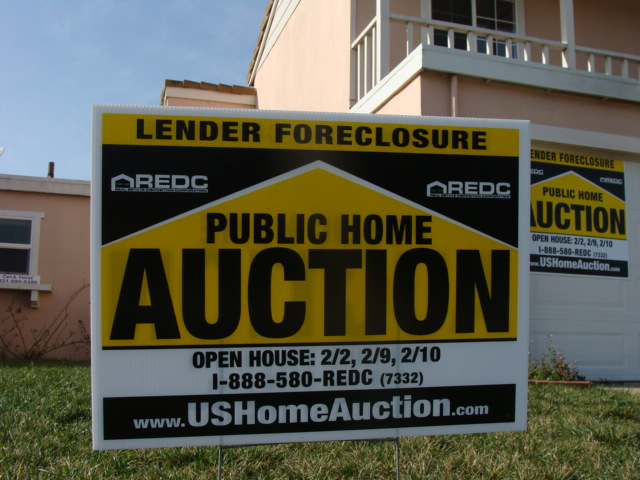
House in Salinas, California, under foreclosure, following the bursting of the 2000s United States housing bubble.

Foreclosure is a legal process in which a lender attempts to recover the balance of a loan from a borrower who has stopped making payments to the lender by forcing the sale of the asset used as the collateral for the loan.

Formally, a mortgage lender (mortgagee), or other lienholder, obtains a termination of a mortgage borrower (mortgagor)'s equitable right of redemption, either by court order or by operation of law (after following a specific statutory procedure).

Usually, a lender obtains a security interest from a borrower who mortgages or pledges an asset like a house to secure the loan. If the borrower defaults and the lender tries to repossess the property, courts of equity can grant the borrower the equitable right of redemption if the borrower repays the debt. While this equitable right exists, it is a cloud on title and the lender cannot be sure that they can repossess the property. Therefore, through the process of foreclosure, the lender seeks to immediately terminate (that is, literally foreclose any future use of) the equitable right of redemption and take both legal and equitable title to the property in fee simple. Other lien holders can also foreclose the owner's right of redemption for other debts, such as for overdue taxes, unpaid contractors' bills or overdue homeowner association dues or assessments.

The foreclosure process as applied to residential mortgage loans is a bank or other secured creditor selling or repossessing a parcel of real property after the owner has failed to comply with an agreement between the lender and borrower called a "mortgage" or "deed of trust". Commonly, the violation of the mortgage is a default in payment of a promissory note, secured by a lien on the property. When the process is complete, the lender can sell the property and keep the proceeds to pay off its mortgage and any legal costs, and it is typically said that "the lender has foreclosed its mortgage or lien". If the promissory note was made with a recourse clause and if the sale does not bring enough to pay the existing balance of principal and fees, then the mortgagee can file a claim for a deficiency judgment. In many states in the United States, items included to calculate the amount of a deficiency judgment include the loan principal, accrued interest and attorney fees less the amount the lender bid at the foreclosure sale.

== Types ==
The mortgage holder can usually initiate foreclosure at a time specified in the mortgage documents, typically some period of time after a default condition occurs. In the United States, Canada and many other countries, several types of foreclosure exist. In the US for example, two of them—namely, by judicial sale and by power of sale—are widely used, but other modes are possible in a few other U.S. states.

=== Judicial ===
Foreclosure by judicial sale, commonly called judicial foreclosure, involves the sale of the mortgaged property under the supervision of a court. The proceeds go first to satisfy the mortgage, then other lien holders, and finally the mortgagor/borrower if any proceeds are left. Judicial foreclosure is available in every US state and required in many (Florida requires judicial foreclosure). The lender initiates judicial foreclosure by filing a lawsuit against the borrower. As with all other legal actions, all parties must be notified of the foreclosure, but notification requirements vary significantly from state to state in the US. A judicial decision is announced after the exchange of pleadings at a (usually short) hearing in a state or local court in the US. In some rather rare instances, foreclosures are filed in US federal courts.

A judicial officer supervises the sale and executes the legal papers and deed if any. This may be done by a superior court judge or a referee specially appointed by a court of judicial privacy.

=== Nonjudicial ===
Foreclosure by power of sale, also called nonjudicial foreclosure, and is authorized by many states if a power of sale clause is included in the mortgage or if a deed of trust with such a clause was used, instead of an actual mortgage. In some US states, like California and Texas, nearly all so-called mortgages are actually deeds of trust. This process involves the sale of the property by the mortgage holder without court supervision (as elaborated upon below). This process is generally much faster and cheaper than foreclosure by judicial sale. As in judicial sale, the mortgage holder and other lien holders are respectively first and second claimants to the proceeds from the sale.

=== Strict ===
Other types of foreclosure are considered minor because of their limited availability. Under strict foreclosure, which is available in a few states including Connecticut, New Hampshire and Vermont, if the mortgagee wins the court case, the court orders the defaulted mortgagor to pay the mortgage within a specified period of time. Should the mortgagor fail to do so, the mortgage holder gains the title to the property with no obligation to sell it. This type of foreclosure is generally available only when the value of the property is less than the debt ("under water"). Historically, strict foreclosure was the original method of foreclosure.

== Acceleration ==
Acceleration is a clause that is usually found in Sections 16, 17, or 18 of a typical mortgage in the US. Not all accelerations are the same for each mortgage, as it depends on the terms and conditions between lender and obligated mortgagor(s). When a term in the mortgage has been broken, the acceleration clause goes into effect. It can declare the entire payable debt to the lender if the borrower(s) were to transfer the title at a future date to a purchaser. The clause in the mortgage also instructs that a notice of acceleration must be served to the obligated mortgagor(s) who signed the Note. Each mortgage gives a time period for the debtor(s) to cure their loan. The most common time periods allot to debtor(s) is usually 30 days, but for commercial property it can be 10 days. The notice of acceleration is called a Demand and/or Breach Letter. In the letter it informs the Borrower(s) that they have 10 or 30 days from the date on the letter to reinstate their loan. Demand/Breach letters are sent out by Certified and Regular mail to all notable addresses of the Borrower(s). Also in the acceleration of the mortgage the lender must provide a payoff quote that is estimated 30 days from the date of the letter. This letter is called an FDCPA (Fair Debt Collections Practices Acts) letter and/or Initial Communication Letter. Once the Borrower(s) receives the two letters providing a time period to reinstate or pay off their loan the lender must wait until that time expires in to take further action. When the 10 or 30 days have passed that means that the acceleration has expired and the Lender can move forward with foreclosing on the property.

The lender will also include any unpaid property taxes and delinquent payments in this amount, so if the borrower does not have significant equity they will owe more than the original amount of the mortgage.

Lenders may also accelerate a loan if there is a transfer clause, obligating the mortgagor to notify the lender of any transfer, whether; a lease-option, lease-hold of 3 years or more, land contracts, agreement for deed, transfer of title or interest in the property.

The vast majority (but not all) of mortgages today have acceleration clauses. The holder of a mortgage without this clause has only two options: either to wait until all of the payments come due or convince a court to compel a sale of some parts of the property in lieu of the past due payments. Alternatively, the court may order the property sold subject to the mortgage, with the proceeds from the sale going to the payments owed the mortgage holder.

== Process ==
The process of foreclosure can be rapid or lengthy and varies from state to state. Other options such as refinancing, a short sale, alternate financing, temporary arrangements with the lender, or even bankruptcy may present homeowners with ways to avoid foreclosure. Websites which can connect individual borrowers and homeowners to lenders are increasingly offered as mechanisms to bypass traditional lenders while meeting payment obligations for mortgage providers. Although there are slight differences between the states, the foreclosure process generally follows a timeline beginning with initial missed payments, moving to a sale being scheduled and finally a redemption period (if available).

=== Strict and judicial ===
In the United States, there are two types of foreclosure in most states described by common law. Using a "deed in lieu of foreclosure," or "strict foreclosure", the noteholder claims the title and possession of the property back in full satisfaction of a debt, usually on contract.

In the proceeding simply known as foreclosure (or, perhaps, distinguished as "judicial foreclosure"), the lender must sue the defaulting borrower in state court. Upon final judgment (usually summary judgment) in the lender's favor, the property is subject to auction by the county sheriff or some other officer of the court. Many states require this sort of proceeding in some or all cases of foreclosure to protect any equity the debtor may have in the property, in case the value of the debt being foreclosed on is substantially less than the market value of the real property; this also discourages a strategic foreclosure by a lender who wants to obtain the property. In this foreclosure, the sheriff then issues a deed to the winning bidder at auction. Banks and other institutional lenders may bid in the amount of the owed debt at the sale but there are a number of other factors that may influence the bid, and if no other buyers step forward the lender receives title to the real property in return.

=== Nonjudicial ===
Historically, the vast majority of judicial foreclosures have been unopposed, since most defaulting borrowers have no money to hire counsel. Therefore, the U.S. financial services industry has lobbied since the mid-19th century for faster foreclosure procedures that would not clog up state courts with uncontested cases, and would lower the cost of credit (because it must always have the cost of recovering collateral built-in). Lenders have also argued that taking foreclosures out of the courts is actually kinder and less traumatic to defaulting borrowers, as it avoids the in terrorem effects of being sued.

In response, a slight majority of U.S. states have adopted nonjudicial foreclosure procedures in which the mortgagee (or more commonly the mortgagee's servicer's attorney, designated agent, or trustee) gives the debtor a notice of default (NOD) and the mortgagee's intent to sell the real property in a form prescribed by state statute; the NOD in some states must also be recorded against the property. This type of foreclosure is commonly called "statutory" or "nonjudicial" foreclosure, as opposed to "judicial", because the mortgagee does not need to file an actual lawsuit to initiate the foreclosure. A few states impose additional procedural requirements such as having documents stamped by a court clerk; Colorado requires the use of a county "public trustee," a government official, rather than a private trustee specializing in carrying out foreclosures. However, in most states, the only government official involved in a nonjudicial foreclosure is the county recorder, who merely records any pre-sale notices and the trustee's deed upon sale.

In this "power-of-sale" type of foreclosure, if the debtor fails to cure the default, or use other lawful means (such as filing for bankruptcy to temporarily stay the foreclosure) to stop the sale, the mortgagee or its representative conduct a public auction in a manner similar to the sheriff's auction. Notably, the lender itself can bid for the property at the auction, and is the only bidder that can make a "credit bid" (a bid based on the outstanding debt itself) while all other bidders must be able to immediately (or within a very short period of time) present the auctioneer with cash or a cash equivalent like a cashier's check.

The highest bidder at the auction becomes the owner of the real property, free and clear of interest of the former owner, but possibly encumbered by liens superior to the foreclosed mortgage (e.g., a senior mortgage, unpaid property taxes, weed/demolition liens). Further legal action, such as an eviction, may be necessary to obtain possession of the premises if the former occupant fails to voluntarily vacate.

=== Defenses ===
In some US states, particularly those where only judicial foreclosure is available, the constitutional issue of due process has affected the ability of some lenders to foreclose. In Ohio, the US federal district court for the Northern District of Ohio has dismissed numerous foreclosure actions by lenders because of the inability of the alleged lender to prove that they are the real party in interest. The same happened in a Colorado district court case in June 2008.

In contrast, in six federal judicial circuits and the majority of nonjudicial foreclosure states (like California), due process has already been judicially determined to be a frivolous defense. The entire point of nonjudicial foreclosure is that there is no state actor (i.e., a court) involved. The constitutional right of due process protects people only from violations of their civil rights by state actors, not private actors. (The involvement of the county clerk or recorder in recording the necessary documents has been held to be insufficient to invoke due process, since they are required by statute to record all documents presented that meet minimum formatting requirements and are denied the discretion to decide whether a particular foreclosure should proceed.)

A further rationale is that under the principle of freedom of contract, if debtors wish to enjoy the additional protection of the formalities of judicial foreclosure, it is their burden to find a lender willing to provide a loan secured by a traditional conventional mortgage instead of a deed of trust with a power of sale. Courts have also rejected as frivolous the argument that the mere legislative act of authorizing or regulating the nonjudicial foreclosure process thereby transforms the process itself into state action.

In turn, since there is no right to due process in nonjudicial foreclosure, it has been held that it is irrelevant whether the borrower had actual notice (i.e., subjective awareness) of the foreclosure, as long as the foreclosure trustee performed the tasks prescribed by statute in an attempt to give notice.

=== Equitable foreclosure ===
"Strict foreclosure" available in some states is an equitable right of the foreclosure sale purchaser. The purchaser must petition a court for a decree that cancels any junior lien holder's rights to the senior debt. If the junior lien holder fails to object within the judicially established time frame, his lien is canceled and the purchaser's title is cleared. This effect is the same as the strict foreclosure that occurred in English common law of equity as a response to the development of the equity of redemption.

=== Title search and tax lien issues ===
In most jurisdictions, it is customary for the foreclosing lender to obtain a title search of the real property and to notify all other persons who may have liens on the property, whether by judgment, by contract, or by statute or other law, so that they may appear and assert their interest in the foreclosure litigation. This is accomplished through the filing of a lis pendens as part of the lawsuit and recordation of it in order to provide public notice of the pendency of the foreclosure action. In all U.S. jurisdictions, a lender who conducts a foreclosure sale of real property that has a federal tax lien must give 25 days notice of the sale to the Internal Revenue Service. Failure to give notice results in the lien remaining attached to the real property after the sale. Therefore, it is imperative the lender search local federal tax liens, so that if parties to the foreclosure have a federal tax lien filed against them, the proper notice to the IRS is given. A detailed explanation by the IRS of the federal tax lien process can be found.

== Contesting a foreclosure ==
Because the right of redemption is an equitable right, foreclosure is an action in equity. To keep the right of redemption, the debtor may be able to petition the court for an injunction. If repossession is imminent, the debtor must seek a temporary restraining order. However, the debtor may have to post a bond in the amount of the debt. This protects the creditor if the attempt to stop foreclosure is simply an attempt to escape the debt.

A debtor may also challenge the validity of the debt in a claim against the bank to stop the foreclosure and sue for damages. In a foreclosure proceeding, the lender also bears the burden of proving they have standing to foreclose.

Several U.S. states, including California, Georgia, and Texas impose a "tender" condition precedent upon borrowers seeking to challenge a wrongful foreclosure, which is rooted in the maxim of equity principle that "he who seeks equity must first do equity", as well as the common law rule that the party seeking rescission of a contract must first return all benefits received under the contract.

In other words, to challenge an allegedly wrongful foreclosure, the borrower must make legal tender of the entire remaining balance of the debt prior to the foreclosure sale. California has one of the strictest forms of this rule, in that the funds must be received by the lender before the sale. One tender attempt was held inadequate when the check arrived via FedEx on a Monday, three days after the foreclosure sale had already occurred on Friday.

At least one textbook has attacked the paradox inherent in the tender rule—namely, if the borrower actually had enough cash to promptly pay the entire balance, they would have already paid it off and the lender would not be trying to foreclose upon them in the first place—but it continues to be the law in the aforementioned states.

Occasionally, borrowers have raised enough cash at the last minute (usually through desperate fire sales of other unencumbered assets) to offer good tender and have thereby preserved their rights to challenge the foreclosure process. Courts have been unsympathetic to attempts by such borrowers to recover fire sale losses from foreclosing lenders.

One noteworthy court case questions the legality of the foreclosure practice is sometimes cited as proof of various claims regarding lending. In the case First National Bank of Montgomery v. Jerome Daly, Jerome Daly claimed that the bank did not offer a legal form of consideration because the money loaned to him was created upon signing of the loan contract. The myth reports that Daly won, did not have to repay the loan, and the bank could not repossess his property. In fact, the "ruling" (widely referred to as the "Credit River Decision") was ruled a nullity by the courts.

In a recent New York case, the Court rejected a lender's attempt to foreclose on summary judgment because the lender failed to submit proper affidavits and papers in support of its foreclosure action and also, the papers and affidavits that were submitted were not prepared in the ordinary course of business. Many borrowers' attorneys will establish a lender proof of compliance with the 90-day pre-foreclosure notice requirement in order to delay and prolong foreclosure proceedings giving the borrower an extra 3 months to clean their record and pay off debt.

== Foreclosure auction ==
When the entity (in the US, typically a county sheriff or designee) auctions a foreclosed property the noteholder may set the starting price as the remaining balance on the mortgage loan. However, there are a number of issues that affect how pricing for properties is considered, including bankruptcy rulings. In a weak market, the foreclosing party may set the starting price at a lower amount if it believes the real estate securing the loan is worth less than the remaining principal of the loan. Time from notice of foreclosures to actual property sales depends on many factors, such as the method of foreclosure (judicial or non-judicial).

When the remaining mortgage balance is higher than the actual home value, the foreclosing party is unlikely to attract auction bids at this price level. A house that has gone through a foreclosure auction and failed to attract any acceptable bids may remain the property of the owner of the mortgage. That inventory is called REO (real estate owned). In these situations, the owner/servicer tries to sell it through standard real estate channels.

In the event a property is auctioned off and sells for more than the underlying debt, the leftover proceeds are often referred to as "surplus funds", "excess funds", "excess proceeds", or "overages". This leftover money legally belongs to the former property owner or junior lienholders, not the foreclosing entity. This has been supported by the Supreme Court of the United States.

== Further borrower's obligations ==
The mortgagor may be required to pay for Private Mortgage Insurance, or PMI, for as long as the principal of his or her primary mortgage is above 80% of the value of his or her property. In most situations, insurance requirements guarantee that the lender gets back some pre-defined proportion of the loan value, either from foreclosure auction proceeds or from PMI or a combination of those.

Nevertheless, in an illiquid real estate market or if real estate prices drop, the property being foreclosed could be sold for less than the remaining balance on the primary mortgage loan, and there may be no insurance to cover the loss. In this case, the court overseeing the foreclosure process may enter a deficiency judgment against the mortgagor. Deficiency judgments can be used to place a lien on the borrower's other property that obligates the mortgagor to repay the difference. It gives lender a legal right to collect the remainder of debt out of mortgagor's other assets (if any).

There are exceptions to this rule. If the mortgage is a non-recourse debt (which is often the case with owner-occupied residential mortgages in the U.S.), lender may not go after borrower's assets to recoup his losses. Lender's ability to pursue deficiency judgment may be restricted by state laws. In California and some other US states, original mortgages (the ones taken out at the time of purchase) are typically non-recourse loans; however, refinanced loans and home equity lines of credit are not.

If the lender chooses not to pursue deficiency judgment—or cannot because the mortgage is non-recourse—and accepts the loss, the borrower may have to pay income taxes on the unrepaid amount if it can be considered "forgiven debt". However, recent changes in tax laws may change the way these amounts are reported.

Any liens resulting from other loans against the property being foreclosed (second mortgages, HELOCs) are "wiped out" by foreclosure.

== Renegotiation alternative ==
In the wake of the United States housing bubble and the subsequent subprime mortgage crisis there has been increased interest in renegotiation or modification of the mortgage loans rather than foreclosure, and some commentators have speculated that the crisis was exacerbated by the "unwillingness of lenders to renegotiate mortgages". Several policies, including the U.S. Treasury sponsored Hope Now initiative and the 2009 "Making Home Affordable" plan have offered incentives to renegotiate mortgages. Renegotiations can include lowering the principal due or temporarily reducing the interest rate. A 2009 study by Federal Reserve economists found that even using a broad definition of renegotiation, only 3% of "seriously delinquent borrowers" received a modification. The leading theory attributes the lack of renegotiation to securitization and a large number of claimants with security interest in the mortgage. There is some support behind this theory, but an analysis of the data found that renegotiation rates were similar among unsecuritized and securitized mortgages. The authors of the analysis argue that banks don't typically renegotiate because they expect to make more money with a foreclosure, as renegotiation imposes "self-cure" and "redefault" risks. Government supported programs such as Home Affordable Refinance Program (HARP) may provide homeowners the ability to refinance their mortgages if they are unable to obtain a traditional refinance due to their declined home value.

A dual-tracking process appeared to be in use by many lenders, however, where the lender would simultaneously talk to the borrower about a "loan modification", but also move ahead with a foreclosure sale of the borrower's property. Borrowers were heard to complain that they were misled by these practices and would often be "surprised" that their home had been sold at foreclosure auction, as they believed they were in a "loan modification process". California has enacted legislation to eliminate this type of "dual-tracking" – The Homeowner Bill of Rights – AB 278, SB 900, That went into effect on January 1, 2013.

== Experiences of households post-foreclosure ==
A 2011 research paper by the Federal Reserve Board, "The Post-Foreclosure Experience of U.S. Households," used credit reports from more than 37 million individuals between 1999 and 2010 to measure post-foreclosure behavior, especially in regard to future borrowing and housing consumption. The study found that: 1) On average 23% of people experiencing foreclosure had moved within a year of the foreclosure process starting. In the same time, a control group (not facing foreclosure) had only a 12% migration rate; 2) Only 30% of post-foreclosure borrowers moved to neighborhoods with median income at least 25% lower than their previous neighborhood; 3) The majority of post-foreclosure migrants do not end up in substantially less-desirable neighborhoods or more crowded living conditions; 4) There was no significant difference in household size between the post-foreclosure and control groups. However, only 17% of the post-foreclosure individuals had the same number and composition of household members after a foreclosure than before. By comparison, the control group maintained the same household companions in 46% of cases; and, 5) Only about 20% of post-foreclosure individuals chose to live in households where one person maintained a mortgage. Overall, the authors conclude that it is "difficult to say whether this small effect is because the shock that leads to foreclosure is not long-lasting, because the credit constraints imposed by having a foreclosure on one's credit report are not large, or because housing services are more inelastic than other forms of consumption."

== Affected demographics ==
Recent housing studies indicate that minority households disproportionately experience foreclosures. Other overly represented groups include African Americans, renter households, households with children, and foreign-born homeowners. For example, statistics show that African American buyers are 3.3 times more likely than white buyers to be in foreclosure, while Latino and Asian buyers are 2.5 and 1.6 times more likely, respectively. As another statistical example, over 60 per cent of the foreclosures that occurred in New York City in 2007 involved rental properties. Twenty percent of the foreclosures nationwide were from rental properties. One reason for this is that the majority of these people have borrowed with risky subprime loans. There is a major lack of research done in this area posing problems for three reasons. One, not being able to describe who experiences foreclosure makes it challenging to develop policies and programs that can prevent/reduce this trend for the future. Second, researchers cannot tell the extent to which recent foreclosures have reversed the advances in homeownership that some groups, historically lacking equal access, have made. Third, research is focused too much on community-level effects even though it is the individual households that are most strongly affected. Many people cite their own or their family members medical conditions as the primary reason for undergoing a foreclosure. Many do not have health insurance and are unable to adequately provide for their medical needs. This again points to the fact that foreclosures affects already vulnerable populations. Credit scores are greatly impacted after a foreclosure. The average number of points reduced when a mortgage payment is 30 days late is 40 – 110 points, 90 days late is 70 – 135 points, and a finalized foreclosure, short sale or deed-in-lieu is 85 – 160 points.

== Recent trends ==
In 2009, the United States Congress tried to rescue the economy with a $700 billion bailout for the financial industry; however, there was a growing consensus that the deepening collapse of the housing market was at the heart of the country's acute economic downturn. After spending billions of dollars rescuing financial institutions only to see the economy spiral even deeper into crisis, both liberal and conservative economists and lawmakers pushed to redirect an economic stimulus bill to what they saw as the core problem: the housing market. But beneath the consensus over helping the housing market, there were huge differences over who should benefit under the competing plans. Democrats wanted to aim money directly at people in the greatest distress; and Republicans wanted to aim money at almost all homebuyers, on the theory that a rising tide would eventually lift all boats.

In 2010, there was a 14% increase in the number of homes receiving a default notice between July and September. In that year one in every 45 homes received a foreclosure filing and the problem has become more widespread with the increasing rates of unemployment across the nation. Banks have become extremely aggressive without much patience for those who have fallen behind on their mortgage payments, and there are more families entering the foreclosure process sooner than ever. In 2011, banks were on track to repossess over 800,000 homes. In 2010, the highest rates of foreclosure filings were in Las Vegas, Nevada; Fort Myers, Florida; Modesto, California; Scottsdale, Arizona; Miami, Florida; and Ontario, California. The geographic diversity of these cities is made up for by the fact they these are all relatively metropolitan areas. Big cities like Houston, Texas saw a 26% increase in 2010, 23% in Seattle, Washington and 21% in Atlanta, Georgia. These cities had the lowest rates of unemployment. On the opposite end of the spectrum, the cities with the lowest rates of foreclosure were Rome, NY; South Burlington, VT; Charleston, WV; Bryan, TX; and Tuscaloosa, AL. Not surprisingly, these areas had some of the highest nationwide rates of unemployment, helping to further demonstrate this correlation. A quote from RealtyTrac CEO James Saccacio summarizes the recent trends:

"Foreclosure floodwaters receded somewhat in 2010 in the nation's hardest-hit housing markets. Even so, foreclosure levels remained five to 10 times higher than historic norms in most of those hard-hit markets, where deep fault-lines of risk remain and could potentially trigger more waves of foreclosure activity in 2011 and beyond."

== Impact of foreclosure ==
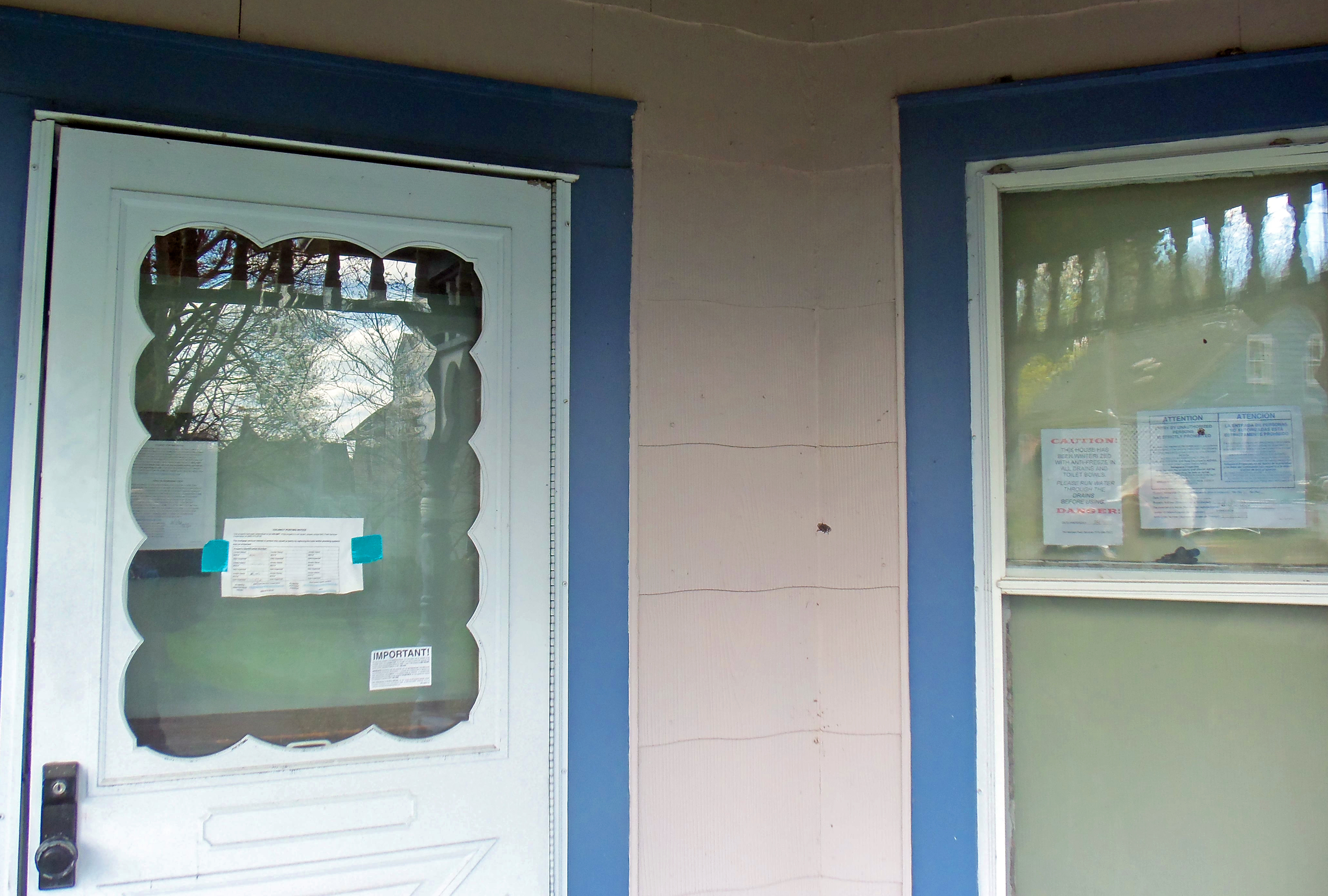
Notices accumulate on the door and window of a foreclosed, unoccupied house.

The impact of foreclosure goes beyond just homeowners but also expands to towns and neighborhoods as a whole. Cities with high foreclosure rates often experience more crime and thefts with abandoned houses being broken into, garbage collecting on lawns, and an increase in prostitution. Foreclosures also impact neighboring housing sales on two levels—space and time. For any given time frame, foreclosures have a greater negative impact when they are closer to the property attempting to be sold. The conventional view suggested is that the increase in foreclosures will cause declines in the sales value of neighboring properties, which, in turn, will lead to an extension of the housing crisis. Another significant impact from increased foreclosure rates is on school mobility of children. In general, research suggests that switching schools is damaging for children, although this does significantly depend on the quality of the origin and destination schools. A study done in New York City revealed that students who changed schools most often entered a school with lower, on average, test scores and overall school performance. The effect of these moves on academic performance for individual students requires further research. Foreclosures also have an emotional and physical effect on people. In one particular study of 250 recruited participants who had experienced foreclosure, 36.7% met screening criteria for major depression.

== By country ==
=== Australia and New Zealand ===
Foreclosure has been prohibited by law in New Zealand for well over a century. Instead the mortgagee realises the security through sale, the exercise of the power of sale also being regulated by statute.

In both of these countries statutory reform has altered the manner in which real property dealings are conducted. What is termed a "mortgage" is a legal interest that is registered against the fee simple title of the property. Since in both countries, the Torrens title system of land registration is used, being registered as proprietor or as a mortgagee creates an indefeasible interest (unless the acquisition of the registration was by land transfer fraud). The mortgagee therefore never holds the fee simple, and there is a statutory process for initiating and conducting a mortgagee sale in the event that the mortgagor defaults. In New Zealand, as in England, say, the land title database is now electronic so there are no paper "title documents".

=== Ireland ===
In Ireland, foreclosure has been abolished by the Land and Conveyancing Reform Act 2009 but Chapter 4 of Part 9 of the National Asset Management Agency Act 2009 provides for vesting orders that are equivalent to foreclosure but may only be used by NAMA.

=== People's Republic of China ===
Foreclosure in the People's Republic of China takes place as a form of debt enforcement proceedings under strict judicial foreclosure, which is only allowed by law of guarantee and law of property right.

China amended the Constitution of the Peoples's Republic of China (adopted April 12, 1988), to allow transfer of land rights, from "granted land rights" to "allocated land rights" thus paving the way for private land ownership, allowing for the renting, leasing, and mortgage of land. The 1990 Regulations on Granting Land Use Rights dealt further with this followed by the Urban Real Estate Law (adopted July 5, 1994), the "Security Law of the People's Republic of China" (adopted June 30, 1995), and then the "Urban Mortgage Measures" (issued May 9, 1997) resulting in land privatization and mortgage lending practices.

==== Mortgages and foreclosure ====
Chinese law and mortgage practices have progressed with safeguards to prevent foreclosures as much as possible. These include mandatory secondary security, rescission (Chinese Contract Law), and maintaining accounts at the lending bank to cover any defaults without prior notice to the borrower. A mortgagee may sue on a note without foreclosing, obtain a general judgment, and collect that judgment against other property of the mortgagor, without foreclosing. When all other avenues have failed a lender may seek a judgement of foreclosure. Under the "Civil Procedure Law", foreclosures should be finalized in a six-month time frame but this is dependent on several things including if the mortgager applies to the court for execution of the judgment. Mortgages are formally foreclosed at auction by a licensed auction specialist.

=== Philippines ===
There are two modes of foreclosure in the Philippines. A mortgagee may foreclose either judicially or extrajudicially, as governed by Rule 68 of the 1997 Revised Rules of Civil Procedure and Act. No. 3135, respectively. A judicial foreclosure is done by filing a complaint in the Regional Trial Court of the place where the property is located. The judge renders judgment, ordering the mortgagor to pay the debt within a period of 90–120 days. If the debt is not paid within the said period, a foreclosure sale satisfies the judgment. In an extrajudicial foreclosure, the mortgagee need not initiate an action in court but may simply file an application before the Clerk of Court to secure attendance of the Sheriff who conducts the public sale. This is done pursuant to a power of sale. Note that these two modes specifically apply to real estate mortgages. Foreclosure of chattel mortgages (mortgage of movable property) are governed by Sec. 14 of Act No. 1506, which gives the mortgagee the right to sell the chattel at a public sale. It has also been held that as regards chattel mortgages, the law does not prohibit that the foreclosure sale be done privately if it is agreed upon by the parties.

=== Spain ===
Unlike in the United States, where a foreclosure means the end of the line, the foreclosure hearing in Spain is just the beginning of the homeowner's troubles. They will have to work for the bank for many years and will be unable to ever own anything—even a car. Spanish mortgage holders are responsible for the full amount of the loan to the bank in addition to penalty interest charges, and court fees. Much of this can be attributed to Spain having the highest unemployment rate in the "euro zone". Unlike in the US, bankruptcy is not an adequate solution since mortgage debt is specifically excluded. Unlike other European countries, you cannot go to the courts for any sort of debt relief. There has been much contention over these policies in the Spanish Parliament but the government is convinced that keeping these policies will prevent Spanish banks from ever experiencing something similar to the US mayhem. With repossessed real estate properties on their books worth about €100 billion the banks in Spain are eager to get rid of foreclosures.

=== South Africa ===
For a developing country, there is a high rate of foreclosures in South Africa because of the privatisation of housing delivery. One of the biggest opponents of foreclosures is the Western Cape Anti-Eviction Campaign which sees foreclosures as unconstitutional and a particular burden on vulnerable poor populations.

=== Switzerland ===
In Switzerland, foreclosure takes place as a form of debt enforcement under Swiss insolvency law.

=== United Kingdom ===
In the United Kingdom, true foreclosures are quite uncommon, with mortgage possession (or alternatively, repossession) being more common.

In the case of mortgage possession or repossession, if the home is sold or auctioned for a price that exceeds the loan balance, those funds are returned to the consumer. Mortgage possession involves legal proceedings in which a mortgagee or other lienholder, usually a lender, obtains a court order for possession of a property, prior to exercising the mortgagor's equitable right of redemption. The eviction is carried out by bailiffs. Once the lender has obtained possession, it can then sell the home to recoup any lost arrears. If the proceeds from a mortgage possession are insufficient to cover the loan then the debtor remains liable for the balance, although in most cases this will become an unsecured debt and the mortgage company will be treated on an equitable basis with the debtor's other unsecured creditors (particularly if the debtor simultaneously or subsequently becomes bankrupt or enters into a voluntary arrangement with creditors).

By contrast, in the case of foreclosure the mortgage company retains all rights to proceeds from a sale or auction but the debtor is not liable for any shortfall. Courts almost never allow it especially if a large surplus is likely to be realised; furthermore, when a substantial surplus is unlikely to be realised then mortgagees are disinclined to seek foreclosure in the first place since that remedy leaves them no recourse to recover a shortfall. Instead, the courts usually grant an order for possession and an order for sale, which both mitigates some of the harshness of the repossession by allowing the sale while allowing lenders further recourse to recover any balance owing following a sale.

The UK has some pre-action protocols in place. Mortgage companies are required to work with homeowners to arrive at a resolution and it is possible to delay court action (ultimately, enabling many to avoid the loss of their home) in situations where the borrower has enrolled in individual programs or if the borrower's income is about to improve significantly with a new job or other measures that would allow them to pay off the arrears. There is no precise parallel to an American short sale, although the UK does have a process known as Assisted Voluntary Sale. An Assisted Voluntary Sale does have some negative credit impact for the consumer, but the adverse effect is less pronounced than one might suffer if the case were to proceed to the courts.

Mortgagors can lose their properties by default on their lease. This could occur where there is unpaid ground rent or unpaid rent on a shared ownership property. In this circumstance the property (or rather the lease) would be subject to forfeiture. Typically, a lender on these properties would pay the ground rent and add it to the mortgage debt to avoid losing their rights to the property.

=== Canada (Alberta) ===
In Alberta, Canada, there are three steps to foreclosure. First, the owner is behind in mortgage payments but still retains full control of the property. Then, the owner is still on title but has lost control of the property to the Court of Queens Bench of Alberta. Last, the legal title has been transferred by the courts to the banks.

The entire foreclosure process in Alberta can take a year or longer. The original owners try to sell over the value to solve their financial problems. The courts favour the owners over the banks and so rarely sell under value. The banks have the money and so never sell under value.

Foreclosures are also sold as is with no recourse for buyers if something goes wrong. That makes foreclosures generally overpriced and risky.

== See also ==
- 2008 financial crisis
- 2010 United States foreclosure crisis
- Conditional dismissal
- Deed in lieu of foreclosure
- Drive-by inspection
- Equity stripping
- Eviction
- Forbearance
- Foreclosure Stripping
- Home Affordable Modification Program (HAMP)
- Home Affordable Refinance Program (HARP)
- HUD auction
- Loss mitigation
- Occupy Homes
- Repossession
- Real estate trends
- Short sale (real estate)
- Strategic default
- Tax taking – Tax Sales, Tax Auctions, Tax Foreclosures
- Vacant property
