= Strict foreclosure =

Strict foreclosure in the law of security interests in the United States, is the foreclosure of personal property that is subject to such an interest. This is permitted under Article 9 of the Uniform Commercial Code. The secured party in a strict foreclosure takes physical possession of collateral, and the debt for which the property served as collateral is discharged as fulfilled. Strict foreclosure is an effective remedy where the creditor has a need or use for the physical property itself. For example, a seller of goods that forecloses on goods in which it had a purchase money security interest (PMSI) may then return the foreclosed goods to its inventory and resell them at its leisure. Similarly, a company that operates equipment and sells some surplus equipment (such as a taxicab company that sells some of its vehicles, or a landscaper that sells excess gardening equipment) can put the foreclosed equipment back into the service of the company. Strict foreclosure is also an effective remedy where the value of the goods foreclosed is the equivalent of the debt due and owing, and the creditor can easily sell the goods for that value.

In order to effect a strict foreclosure, the creditor must transmit a proposal indicating their desire to foreclose, which must be sent to the debtor and to secondary obligors (guarantors of the debt). If the collateral is not consumer goods, the notice must also be sent to other secured parties known to the foreclosing creditor, either because they have notified the foreclosing creditor of their interest, or because they have perfected their interest by filing the appropriate documents with the state secretary of state. If any notified party objects within 20 days, irrespective of reason, then strict foreclosure will not be permitted. Instead, the creditor will have to sell the property in a commercially reasonable manner, and will recoup its debt from the proceeds of that sale. This prevents subordinated creditors from having their interest in the value of the property cut off, since any amount recovered in the sale over and above the amount of the foreclosing creditor's debt will go to the remaining creditors.

A recent modification to the rule provides that strict foreclosure will also not be permitted if the debtor has repaid at least 60% of the loan for which consumer goods have been put up as collateral, or has paid 60% or cash price of consumer goods bought under a PMSI. This rule prevents the creditor from realizing a windfall gain by foreclosing on property that is substantially more valuable than the remaining debt. If the 60% threshold has been met, then the creditor will have to sell the collateral within 90 days, and must recoup its debt from the proceeds of that sale, returning all excess to the debtor.
