= 311 Foreclosure Prevention Programs =

Aid to help prevent foreclosure

The City of Chicago and Neighborhood Housing Services (NHS) of Chicago pioneered the 311 Foreclosure Prevention Program as a consumer counseling and information service which helps homeowners at risk of losing their homes to foreclosure, credit counseling and advocacy services.

Recently, the cities of Baltimore, and Dallas started similar programs to assist at-risk homeowners and protect the integrity of their neighborhoods.
