= Knightsbridge Estates Trust Ltd v Byrne =

UK case law

- Court: House of Lords
- Citation: [1940] AC 613

Court membership
- Judges sitting: Viscount Maugham; Lord Wright; Lord Atkin; Lord Romer; Lord Porter

Keywords
- Security interest; priority; Clog; Equity of redemption

Knightsbridge Estates Trust Ltd v Byrne [1940] AC 613 is a UK insolvency law case, concerning the creation of a security interest.

== Facts ==
Knightsbridge Estates wished to pay off the principle sum of the £310,000 loan from Mr Byrne’s insurance company. However, the contract stated the repayments would be made over 40 years, twice a year. If Knightsbridge paid off the principal early, it would reduce the total amount of interest it would pay to Mr Byrne. Knightsbridge Estates argued that the long repayment schedule was a clog on the equity of redemption. Byrne argued that because the loan counted as a debenture, under Companies Act 1929 section 74 (now Companies Act 2006, section 739) it was exempt from the rule of equity on clogs of redemption and the contract stayed as it was created.

In the Court of Appeal, Lord Greene MR held that the loan was a debenture. He said that this was ‘a commercial agreement between two important corporations, experienced in such matters, and has none of the features of an oppressive bargain.’

== Judgment ==
The House of Lords upheld the Court of Appeal. Viscount Maugham gave the leading judgment holding that the loan was a debenture. He added that it could be a debenture for this provision of the Act, even if a mortgage might not be a debenture under every provision of the Act.

My Lords, loans made to limited companies on the security of their assets are in general very different from loans made to individuals. Companies may be wound up, in which event their debts have, if possible, to be paid, but they do not die. To the knowledge of both the company and the lender, the loan is intended in most cases to be of the nature of a permanent investment. The former can only in the rarest of circumstances be at the mercy of the latter. There is no likelihood of oppression being exerted against the company. Considerations such as these make it manifest that clauses in debentures issued by companies making them irredeemable or redeemable only after long periods of time or on contingencies ought to be given validity. It may be conceded that the ground for excluding the rule in equity is stronger in the case of a series of debentures issued in one of the usual forms than in the case of mortgages of land to an individual; but some of the reasons still remain. It is difficult to see any real unfairness in a normal commercial agreement between a company and (for example) an insurance society for a loan to the former on the security of its real estate for a very prolonged term of years. Both parties may be equally desirous that the mortgage may have the quality of permanence. There is a great deal to be said in such a case for freedom of contract.

Lord Wright and Lord Atkin concurred.

Lord Romer gave a concurring judgment holding that the mortgage constituted a debenture under the Companies Act 1929 section 380 and was therefore not void under Companies Act 1929, section 74.

Lord Porter concurred.
