= William Rann Kennedy =

British jurist and classical scholar (1846–1915)

The Right Honourable Sir William Rann Kennedy FBA
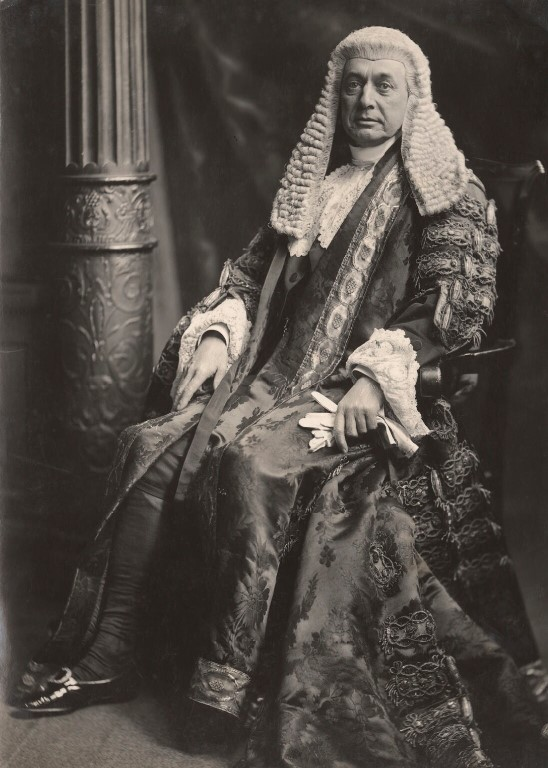
- Kennedy, 1897–1915

Lord Justice of Appeal
- In office 1907–1915
- Monarch: Edward VII

Personal details
- Born: William Rann Kennedy; 11 March 1846 Kensington, London
- Died: 7 January 1915 (aged 68) Kensington, London
- Resting place: Highgate Cemetery
- Spouse: Cecilia Sarah Richmond
- Relations: Benjamin Hall Kennedy and Charles Rann Kennedy (uncles)
- Education: King's College, Cambridge
- Occupation: Judge
- Profession: Law

Sir William Rann Kennedy, FBA (11 March 1846 – 17 January 1915) was a British jurist and Lord Justice of Appeal and accomplished classical scholar.

== Life ==
Kennedy was born in the family home at 9 Campden Hill Villas, Kensington, London on 11 March 1846, the eldest son of the Rev William James Kennedy and his cousin, Sarah Caroline Kennedy, and grandson to the Rev Rann Kennedy.

He was born into a family of distinguished classicists: three of his uncles had been senior classics at Cambridge; Benjamin Hall Kennedy, the former headmaster of Shrewsbury School and Professor of Greek at Cambridge, who headed the Tripos in 1827; Charles Rann Kennedy, a barrister and noted translator of Demosthenes, in 1831; and George John Kennedy, in 1832. All three were also Porson medallists at Cambridge (Kennedy's father was also claimed to be a Porson medallist, but his name is not listed).

Kennedy was sent to study at Eton College rather than the traditional family school of Shrewsbury, largely as his uncle was headmaster there. He won a foundation scholarship at King's College, Cambridge. After winning the Craven and Bell scholarships and the Powis Medal, he came top in classics in 1868 - the fourth member of his family to do. Afterwards he was elected to a fellowship at Pembroke College, Cambridge.

For a year he served as private secretary President of the Poor Law Board.

== Law ==
Kennedy was called to the Bar by Lincoln's Inn in 1871, and he took silk in 1885. His practice was mainly in Liverpool on circuit. In 1891 he published Law on Civil Salvage (a second edition would be published in 1907).

== Politics ==
Kennedy stood for election three times for the Liberal Party, but lost on all three occasions. He stood for Birkenhead in 1885 and 1892 and lost to General Sir Edward Hamley both times. Later in 1892 he contested the seat of St Helens, where he narrowly lost to Sir Henry Seton-Karr by just 59 votes.

== Judicial office ==
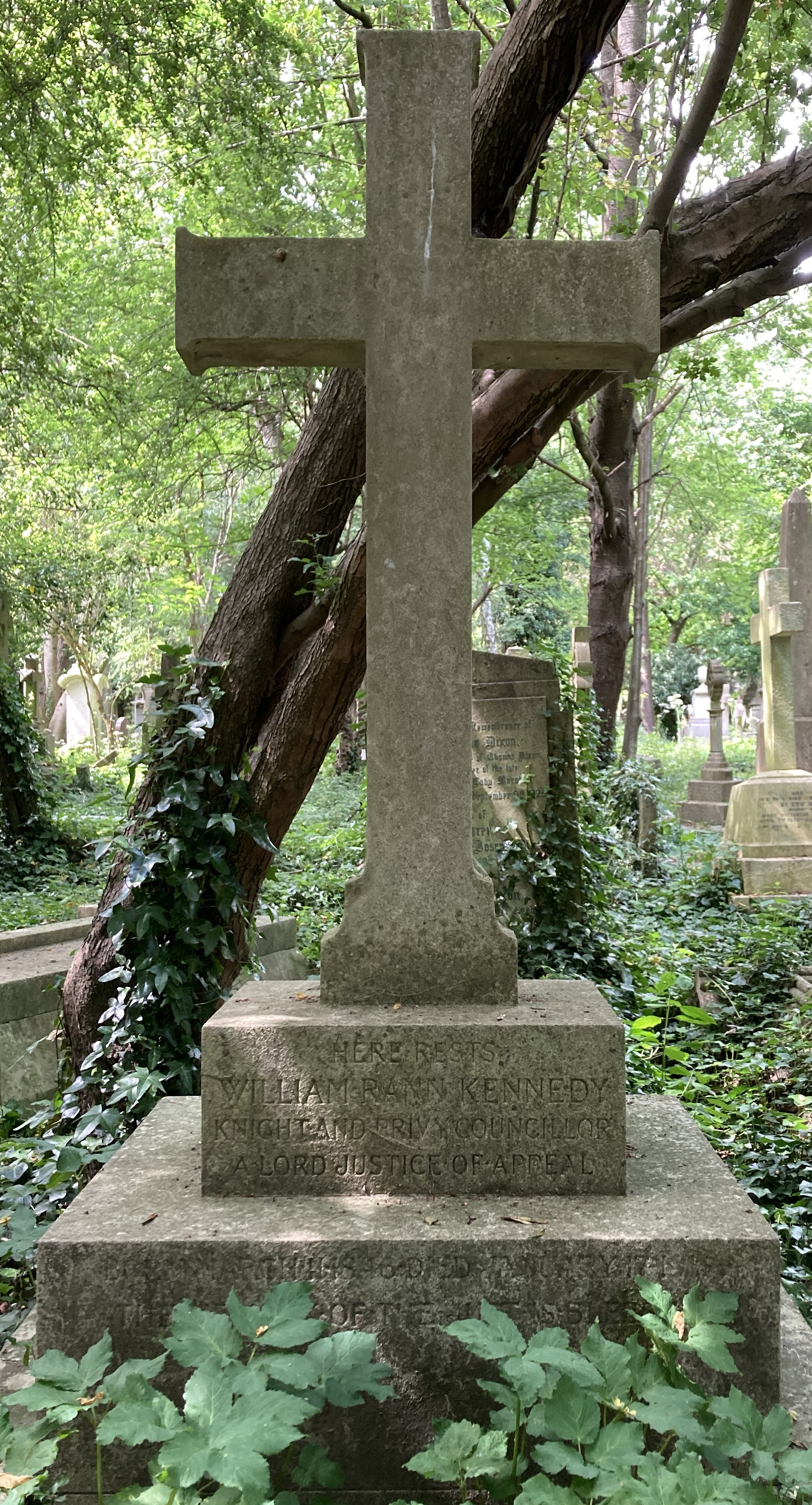
Grave of William Rann Kennedy in Highgate Cemetery

After his defeat in the St Helen's by-election in 1892, Kennedy was appointed as a High Court judge assigned to the Queen's Bench, receiving the customary knighthood. On the bench Kennedy developed a reputation as a slow and ponderous judge; his cleverness tending towards indecision. In 1893 Vanity Fair published a highly critical article of him, stating that although he was "liked and respected" nonetheless "with all his virtues, he is a failure as a judge", and concluding that he was "a very weak Judge with excellent intentions."

In 1907 he was elevated to the Court of Appeal and sworn of the Privy Council. He would hold these offices until his death in 1915. He was buried on the western side of Highgate Cemetery.

Notable decisions which Kennedy was involved in included the first instance decision in Allen v Flood [1898] AC 1, and the Court of Appeal decision in British South Africa Company v De Beers Consolidated Mines Ltd [1910] 2 Ch 502.

In 1909, Kennedy was elected a fellow of the British Academy.

== Arms ==
Coat of arms of William Rann Kennedy
| Motto Avis La Fin |
