= Equity stripping =

Predatory lending practice

Equity stripping, also known as equity skimming, is a type of foreclosure rescue scheme. Often considered a form of predatory lending, equity stripping became increasingly widespread in the early 2000s. In an equity stripping scheme an investor buys the property from a homeowner facing foreclosure and agrees to lease the home to the homeowner who may remain in the home as a tenant. Often, these transactions take advantage of uninformed, low-income homeowners; because of the complexity of the transaction, victims are often unaware that they are giving away their property and equity. Several states have taken steps to confront the more unscrupulous practices of equity stripping. Although "foreclosure re-conveyance" schemes can be beneficial and ethically conducted in some circumstances, many times the practice relies on fraud and egregious or unmeetable terms.

== Term and definition ==
The term "equity stripping" has sometimes referred to lending refinance practices that charge excessive fees thereby "stripping the equity" out of the home. The practice more often describes foreclosure rescue scams. While most do not consider equity stripping a form of predatory lending per se, equity stripping is related to traditional forms of that practice. Subprime loans targeted at vulnerable and unsophisticated homeowners often lead to foreclosure, and those victims more often fall to equity stripping scams. Additionally, some do consider equity stripping, in essence, a form of predatory lending since the scam works essentially like a high-cost and risky refinancing. Equity stripping, however, is conducted almost always by local agents and investors, while traditional predatory lending is carried out by large banks or national companies.

== Alternate Uses ==
In addition to the fraudulent uses described here, the term "equity stripping" also refers to the asset protection concept whereby the equity of an asset is encumbered, or stripped, to frustrate collection efforts by unsecured creditors. This can be done to protect the assets of individuals or organizations in high-risk businesses (e.g. doctors) from losing equity in lawsuit actions.

== Scam Elements ==
=== Foreclosure ===
A homeowner falls behind on his mortgage payments and enters foreclosure. Foreclosure notices are published in newspapers or distributed by reporting services to investors and rescue artists. Foreclosed homeowners also contact lenders to inquire about refinancing options.

=== Solicitation ===
Rescue artists obtain contact information for foreclosed homeowners and make contacts personally, by phone, or through direct mail. Some lenders and brokers will also refer foreclosed homeowners that do not qualify for new loans to rescue artists for a commission. Rescue artists offer the foreclosed homeowner a "miracle refinancing" and/or say they can "save the home" from foreclosure.

=== Acquisition ===
A method to achieve this involves obtaining new financing for the property. Rescue artists approach the homeowner using a title such as private investor. An additional party, called a straw borrower, acts as the buyer in the sale. This requires the involvement of lenders and an approval process, as the borrower takes a type of mortgage loan called a cash-out refinance to purchase the property. Rescue artists arrange the closing (often delaying the date until shortly before the homeowner's removal to create urgency). At the closing, the homeowner transfers the title (possibly unwittingly) to the rescue artist or an arranged investor. The rescue artist or arranged investor pays off the amount owed in foreclosure to acquire the deed, and inherits or is paid any portion of the homeowner's remaining equity. The rescue artist will express intention to reconvey the property back to the homeowner in the form of a lease or a contract for deed.

Simple mortgage assumption allows the owner of the home in foreclosure to transfer the deed to the property to the rescue artist without the involvement of any lender. This results in a transfer of ownership and debt to the rescue artist through a private transaction. Without lender approval, the original owner of the home remains fully liable for any debt owed on the property. The rescue artist may in this case either charge rent payments to the owner with a false promise of the ability to eventually repurchase the property, or charge payments the original owner is led to believe are toward a refinanced mortgage. In these cases, the property remains in foreclosure status, unbeknownst to the original owner. After the transfer of the deed, the original owner and the rescue artist are held equally liable for the remaining debt and pursued by the lender for payment.

=== Result ===
The homeowners remain in the home and pay rent or contract-for-deed payments (often higher than their previous mortgage payments). The rescue artist may immediately abscond with the funds obtained from any equity cash-out, defaulting on the new mortgage loan. The rescue artist may not leave with the equity proceeds immediately; rather, they may charge rent payments to the original owner (now tenant). Though the original owner may be led to believe they are paying toward owning the property again, the rescue artist does not intend to relinquish the property to them at any time. In some instances, the rescue artist takes as many rental payments as possible while defaulting on the mortgage, leaving the original owner to be evicted from the property in the resulting foreclosure, losing both their home and money. In other instances, the rescue artist establishes rental terms purposely unaffordable for the original owner. They inevitably fall behind and are evicted from their homes. In this case, the rescue artist may use or sell the property however they choose.

== Legal Remedies ==
Several states have passed laws to prevent and/or regulate equity stripping schemes. Minnesota passed a comprehensive law aimed at "foreclosure re-conveyance" practices in 2004, and Maryland in 2005 was the first of at least 14 other states to adopt the Minnesota model for regulating these transactions. These state laws require adequate disclosures, capped fees, and an ability to pay on behalf of the consumer. The statutes also ban certain deceptive and unfair practices associated with equity stripping.

Other laws regulating the activity of "foreclosure consultants" have been passed in California, Georgia, and Missouri.

Additionally, state fraud and unfair and deceptive trade practices laws may be applicable. The Truth in Lending Act may also govern some transactions.

== Non-Predatory Foreclosure Rescue ==
In certain circumstances, foreclosure rescue services can be beneficial to the consumer. When refinancing options are exhausted and foreclosure proceedings have led to near eviction, a foreclosure rescue transaction with moderate fees and full disclosures can be legally and ethically executed.

A consumer can face removal from the property and the loss of their entire equity following a foreclosure auction. As an alternative, foreclosure rescuers have the ability to redeem the home from foreclosure with a new mortgage of their own. For a moderate fee or portion of the existing equity, this can keep the former homeowner in the home as a tenant while they repair their credit or increase their income. After a given time period, the homeowner can then repurchase the property from the rescuer.

If done with full verbal and written disclosure, terms the consumer is capable of fulfilling, and moderate total fees, foreclosure rescue can be suitable to consumers in dire situations.

This mechanism is often used by family members or friends in order to prevent the loss of a home. In effect, the investor "lends" their good credit to the foreclosed homeowner by paying off the foreclosed mortgage and obtaining the title to the home temporarily.
