= Equitable right =

An equitable right is a legal right guaranteed by equity as opposed to a legal right which derives authority from a legal source.

An example of an equitable right could be seen in Real property law, where mention is made of a beneficial interest i.e. vested interests in an estate which are protected by equity. In essence, a contributor to the purchase of a property, has an equitable right to that property albeit not being the registered proprietor or on the deed, as well as equity of redemption. Equitable rights can be built be upon one another.

In most of the United States, it is no longer necessary to go to an equity court or court of chancery to enforce an equitable right. There are exceptions, such as Delaware.

Equitable rights require "clean hands", that is, that the person petitioning for a court to use equitable powers has done nothing wrong to make the situation worse. If an equitable right is equal to a legal right, the legal right prevails.

== See also ==
- Clean hands doctrine
- Equitable assignment
