= MortgageLoan =

Mortgage Loan Directory and Information, LLC
- Type: Private
- Industry: Personal finance
- Founded: 1995
- Headquarters: New York City, United States
- Area served: U.S.
- Website: Mortgageloan.com

Mortgage Loan Directory and Information, LLC is a publisher providing editorial content and directory information in the field of mortgages and personal finance based in New York City, in the United States. It operates MortgageLoan.com a personal finance website that provides consumer mortgage news, information and comparison shopping services.

== History and Services ==
In continuous operation since registration in 1995 MortgageLoan.com claims to be "the first Internet site to feature live mortgage interest rates on the Internet for consumers". The company's syndicated content is published by financial institutions, state agencies, professional news media and business periodicals.
