= HUD auction =

A HUD auction is a form of foreclosure auction except the original lender was a federal agency instead of a private lender. The United States Department of Housing and Urban Development (HUD), is the insurer of loans made through a variety of government programs, particularly FHA loans. When a lender forecloses on a government insured loan, HUD takes possession of the property.

Homes are listed on the Multiple Listing Service by a listing agent who generally receives a 1% commission for listing the property, but is otherwise unaffiliated with HUD.
