= First National Bank of Montgomery v. Daly =

1968 lawsuit in Minnesota

First National Bank of Montgomery v. Jerome Daly, Dec. 9, 1968 (Justice Court, Credit River Township, Scott County, Minnesota), also known as the Credit River Case, was a case tried before a justice of the peace in Minnesota in 1968. The case is not a Supreme Court case or an appeals court case, and does not set a legal precedent. The decision in that case is sometimes cited by opponents of the United States banking system.

== The trial ==
An attorney named Jerome Daly was a defendant in a civil case in Credit River Township, Scott County, Minnesota, heard on December 9, 1968. The plaintiff was the First National Bank of Montgomery, which had foreclosed on Daly's property for nonpayment of the mortgage, and was seeking to evict him from the property.

Daly based his defense on the argument that the bank had not actually loaned him any money but had simply created credit on its books. Daly argued that the bank had thus not given him anything of value and was not entitled to the property that secured the loan. The jury and the justice of the peace, Martin V. Mahoney, agreed with this argument. The jury returned a verdict for the defendant, and the justice of the peace declared that the mortgage was "null and void" and that the bank was not entitled to possession of the property. The justice found in his ruling that some provisions in the Minnesota Constitution and some Minnesota statutes were repugnant to the Constitution of the United States and the Bill of Rights in the Minnesota Constitution, and thus could not be upheld.

== The result ==
The immediate effect of the decision would have been that Daly would not have been required to pay the mortgage debt or relinquish the property. However, the bank appealed the next day, and the decision was ultimately nullified on the grounds that a justice of the peace did not have the power to make such a ruling.

This nullified case and its reasoning have nevertheless been cited by groups opposing the Federal Reserve System and, in particular, the practice of fractional-reserve banking. Such groups argue the case demonstrates that the Federal Reserve System is unconstitutional. Because the Credit River decision was nullified, the case has no legal standing as precedent. A U.S. District Court decision in Utah in 2008 mentioned half a dozen such citations, noting that similar arguments have "repeatedly been dismissed by the courts as baseless" and that "courts around the country have repeatedly dismissed efforts to void loans based on similar assertions."

== Daly's disbarment and criminal convictions ==
The defendant, Jerome Daly, was a longtime tax protester. He was convicted of willfully failing to file federal income tax returns for the years 1967 and 1968. In rejecting his appeal, the United States Court of Appeals for the Eighth Circuit noted: "Defendant's fourth contention involves his seemingly incessant attack against the federal reserve and monetary system of the United States. His apparent thesis is that the only 'Legal Tender Dollars' are those which contain a mixture of gold and silver and that only those dollars may be constitutionally taxed. This contention is clearly frivolous." According to Article 1, Section 10 of the United States Constitution, "No state shall... make any thing but gold and silver coin a tender in payment of debts."

Daly had been an attorney, but was later disbarred by a decision of the Minnesota Supreme Court in a case similar to the Credit River case, involving the same justice of the peace, in which disbarment proceeding the Court stated that Daly had:

without justifiable explanation or excuse, intentionally and defiantly disregarded an order of this court prohibiting him and a justice of the peace from further proceedings in a declaratory judgment action, then pending before the justice of the peace, which was obviously, and for numerous reasons outlined in our decision, beyond the limits of jurisdiction of a justice of the peace.

Daly was also convicted of conspiracy to defraud the United States under 18 U.S.C. section 371, fifteen counts of willfully aiding and assisting in the preparation of false individual income tax returns under Internal Revenue Code section 7206(2), and one count of aiding and abetting the making of a false statement to the United States government under 18 U.S.C. sections 2 and 1001, in connection with a tax scheme involving the "Basic Bible Church of America".

== Additional sources ==
- https://web.archive.org/web/20091002101309/http://www.lawlibrary.state.mn.us/CreditRiver/CreditRiver.html (all original documents)
