= Conditional dismissal =

Dismissal in United States law subject to conditions

A conditional dismissal is a dismissal in United States law subject to conditions that must be fulfilled by one or more parties to the case. If the conditions are met within a specified time, the case is closed without further action; failure to satisfy the terms may result in the case being reinstated. Conditional dismissals arise in both civil and criminal law contexts, and their precise operation varies by jurisdiction.

== Civil law ==
=== General principles ===
In civil proceedings, a conditional dismissal typically arises when parties reach a settlement agreement requiring performance over time—such as instalment payments—in exchange for a dismissal of the pending action. Courts and parties use this mechanism where they want the case dismissed but wish to retain the ability to reopen it if the agreed terms are not honoured.

An early example is the dismissal of a suit for foreclosure of a mortgage, subject to receipt of payment in the amount of a tender which induced the dismissal. Thompson v. Crains, 294 Ill. 270, 128 N.E. 508, 12 A.L.R. 931.

=== Federal rules ===
At the federal level, voluntary dismissals are governed by Federal Rules of Civil Procedure (FRCP) Rule 41. Under Rule 41(a)(2), once a defendant has filed an answer, a plaintiff may only dismiss an action by court order, and the court may impose conditions it considers proper before granting such an order. This gives courts an express basis for attaching conditions to a voluntary dismissal, such as the payment of the opposing party's costs.

Unless a dismissal order states otherwise, a dismissal under Rule 41(a)(2) is without prejudice, meaning the plaintiff may refile the action.

=== Michigan ===
Michigan court rules provide a specific procedural mechanism for conditional dismissals in civil settlement contexts. The consent order of dismissal must be signed and approved by all parties, and must clearly state the terms for reinstatement of the case and entry of judgment.

If a party defaults on the settlement terms, the non-defaulting party may file an affidavit with the court stating the breach, serve it on the other party, and apply for reinstatement of the case and entry of a consent judgment. If no timely objection is filed, the court may reinstate the case and enter judgment without further process. If objections are filed, the court must resolve them at a hearing before deciding whether to enter judgment.

== Criminal law ==
=== Overview ===
In criminal proceedings, a conditional dismissal functions as a form of diversion, allowing eligible defendants—typically first-time offenders charged with minor offences—to have charges dismissed upon completion of court-imposed conditions over a probationary period. Conditions commonly include remaining arrest-free, completing community service, submitting to drug testing, and paying applicable fines and costs. If the defendant violates any condition during the supervisory period, the court may reinstate the proceedings and impose sentence.

=== New Jersey ===
New Jersey's conditional dismissal program is codified at N.J.S.A. 2C:43-13.1 et seq., enacted by P.L. 2013, c. 158. It is available to first-time offenders charged with a disorderly persons offense or petty disorderly persons offense who have not previously participated in diversion programs such as Pretrial Intervention (PTI) or conditional discharge.

An eligible defendant may, after a plea of guilty or a finding of guilt but prior to entry of a judgment of conviction, apply to the court for admission into the conditional dismissal program. If admitted, the defendant is placed under probation monitoring for a period of one year. The court considers factors including the nature of the offence, the defendant's background, whether the offence is violent, and whether diversion is consistent with the public interest.

Upon successful completion, the charge is dismissed and does not constitute a conviction for purposes of legal disqualification or future offence determinations, though it is reported to the State Bureau of Identification for purposes of determining future eligibility for diversion programs. A defendant may participate in the conditional dismissal program only once.

A defendant admitted to the program must pay a $75 application fee, as well as any restitution, costs, and mandatory assessments that would have applied upon conviction of the charged offence.

== Relationship to related concepts ==
A conditional dismissal is distinct from:

- A dismissal with prejudice, which permanently bars refiling of the same claim;
- A dismissal without prejudice, which permits refiling but imposes no ongoing conditions;
- A consent order, which is a standing court order governing the parties' obligations without necessarily dismissing the action;
- A stipulated dismissal, which is an unconditional dismissal agreed to by all parties under FRCP Rule 41(a)(1)(A)(ii).

== See also ==
- Diversion program
- Federal Rules of Civil Procedure
- Plea bargain
