= Equity of redemption =

Right to redeem property after discharge of a mortgage

The equity of redemption refers to the right of a mortgagor to redeem his or her property once the debt secured by the mortgage has been discharged.

== Overview ==
Historically, a mortgagor (the borrower) and a mortgagee (the lender) executed a conveyance of legal title to the property in favour of the mortgagee as security for the loan. If the loan was repaid, then the mortgagee would return the property; if the loan was not repaid, then the mortgagee would keep the property in satisfaction of the debt. The equity of redemption was the right to petition the courts of equity to compel the mortgagee to transfer the property back to the mortgagor once the secured obligation had been performed. Today, most mortgages are granted by statutory charge rather than by a formal conveyance, although theoretically there is usually nothing to stop two parties from executing a mortgage in the more traditional manner.

Traditionally, the courts have been astute to ensure that the mortgagee did not introduce any artificial stipulations into the contractual arrangements to impede a mortgagor's ability to satisfy obligations and reclaim the property. Such impediments are "clogs" on the equity of redemption, and the courts of equity were particularly astute in striking down any provision which was, or in later cases, which may be, a clog.

Where collateral is pledged in prime brokerage transactions, it is common for the broker to rehypothecate the collateral. Concerns remained, however, that because the rehypothecation might theoretically mean that the lender could lose title to the collateral, and thereby possibly be unable to reconvey it to the primary customer, it was speculated that such rehypothecation is possibly unlawful.

The tide has for some years now turned against striking down every clause in a mortgage document that might conceivably impede the right to redeem.

The equity of redemption is itself recognised as a separate species of property, and can be bought, sold or even itself mortgaged by the holder.

Historically the equity of redemption would naturally expire upon the mortgagor breaching the terms of repayment. However, in modern times, extinguishing the equity of redemption (and leaving the mortgagee with absolute title to the property) ordinarily requires a court order in most jurisdictions. For both legal and practical reasons, the use of foreclosure as a remedy has fallen into disuse. Even where a mortgagee seeks an order for foreclosure from the courts, the courts will frequently order judicial sale of the property instead.

== See also ==
- Vernon v Bethell (1762) 28 ER 838
- Knightsbridge Estates Trust Ltd v Byrne [1940] AC 613
- British South Africa Company v De Beers Consolidated Mines Ltd [1910] 2 Ch 502
- Mortgage law
- Security interest
