= Trustee (disambiguation) =

A trustee is a legal term for a holder of property on behalf of a beneficiary.

Trustee or trusty may also refer to:

== Stewardship ==
- Board of trustees, a group of people who jointly supervise the activities of an organization
  - Trustee-in-trust
- Trusty system (prison) (or "trustee system"), system of discipline and security in prisons
- Trusteeism, a Roman Catholic parish administration system
- Township trustee, minor political office

== People ==
- Trusty Gina, Swaziland politician
- Auston Trusty (born 1998), American soccer player
- Landon Trusty (born 1981), American football tight end
- Sharon Trusty (born 1945), American politician

== Vehicles ==
- SS Trusty, a steamship
- HMS Trusty
- Consolidated PT-1 Trusty, an airplane
- Triumph Model H, a motorcycle also known as 'the Trusty'

== Other uses ==
- Trustee model of representation, a model for the role of representatives
- Trusty (band), an American punk band
- Trusty (dog), famous dog
- Trusty, a bloodhound in Lady and the Tramp
- Trusty Mountain, a summit located in Central New York
- Ubuntu 14.04 Trusty Tahr (or "Trusty"), code name for a release of the Ubuntu Linux
- Trustee Building, in Los Angeles, California

== See also ==
- Trustor (disambiguation)
- Trust (disambiguation)
- Trusteer, a portfolio of digital identity trust software products
- Trustee System (disambiguation)
- Trusteeship (disambiguation)
