= Trust =

Trust often refers to:

- Trust (sentiment), confidence in or dependence on a person or quality

It may also refer to:

== Business and law ==
- Trust (law), a legal relationship in which one person holds property for another's benefit
- Trust (business), the combination of several businesses under the same management to prevent competition
- Investment trust, a form of investment fund

== Arts, entertainment, and media ==
=== Films ===
- The Trust (1915 film), a lost silent drama
- Trust (1976 film), Finnish-Soviet historical drama
- Trust (1990 film), dark romantic comedy by Hal Hartley
- The Trust (1993 film), American drama about a murder in 1900
- Trust (1999 film), British television crime drama
- Trust, 2009, starring Jamie Luner and Nels Lennarson
- Trust (2010 film), drama directed by David Schwimmer
- The Trust (2016 film), starring Nicolas Cage and Elijah Wood
- Trust (2021 film), drama directed by Brian DeCubellis
- Trust (2025 film), thriller starring Sophie Turner

=== Television ===
- Trust (game show), French game show aired in 2012
- Trust (British TV series), a 2003 UK legal drama
- Trust (American TV series), a 2018 FX series
- The Trust: A Game of Greed, a 2024 Netflix reality game show
- "Trust" (Chancer), a 1990 episode
- "Trust" (Justified), a 2015 episode
- "Trust" (Revenge), a 2011 episode
- "Trust" (Wildfire), a 2005 episode

=== Music ===
==== Artists ====
- Trust (Belgian band), a pop music group formed in 2007
- Trust (Canadian band), a synthpop music group formed in 2010
- Trust (French band), a rock music group formed in 1977
- The Trust (music production duo), a U.S. music production duo

==== Albums ====
- Trust (Alfie Boe album), 2013
- Trust (Boney James album), 1992
- Trust (Brother Beyond album), 1989
- Trust (Elvis Costello album), 1981
- Trust (Jaci Velasquez album), 2017
- Trust (Low album), 2002
- Trust (Saga album), 2006

=== Other uses in arts, entertainment, and media ===
- The Trust, a fictional entity in the Stargate franchise
- Trust, a computer in Raised by Wolves
- Trust (novel), 2022, by Hernan Diaz
- Trust (magazine), a free tri-annual investment trust magazine

==== Songs ====
- "Trust" (Ayumi Hamasaki song), 1998
- "Trust" (Brent Faiyaz song), 2018
- "Trust" (Brother Beyond song), 1990
- "Trust" (Keyshia Cole and Monica song), 2008
- "Trust" (Megadeth song), 1997
- "Trust" (Pharcyde song), 2000
- "Trust", by Adema from their eponymous album, 2001
- "Trust", by Bad Gyal from Worldwide Angel, 2018
- "Trust", by The Cure from Wish, 1992
- "Trust", by Fivio Foreign, 2020
- "Trust", by GFriend from Snowflake, 2016
- "Trust", by Jonas Brothers from Happiness Begins, 2019
- "Trust", by Justin Bieber from Purpose, 2015
- "Trust", English version title of Lara Fabian's song "Croire", 1988
- "Trust", by L'Arc-en-Ciel from Awake, 2005
- "Trust", by Neon Trees from Picture Show, 2012
- "Trust", by NF and Tech N9ne from Clouds, 2021
- "Trust", by Nightingale from White Darkness, 2007
- "Trust", by Prince from Batman, 1989
- "Trust", by PrettyMuch, 2021
- "Trust", by Sevendust from Animosity, 2001
- "Trust", by Thrice from The Illusion of Safety, 2002
- "Trust!", by Rebecca Black from Salvation, 2025

== Brands and enterprises ==
- Trust (electronics company), a European producer and designer of computer peripherals and accessories, mainly in the low-budget market
- Trust Company Ltd., a car parts company

== Computing ==
- TRUST, a computer system for tracking trains
- Computational trust, generation of trusted authorities or user trust through cryptography
- Trust metric, a measurement of the degree to which group members trust each other, as in online networking
- Trusted system, a computerized system relied on to enforce a security policy
- Web of trust, a system used in cryptography to establish authenticity
- WOT Services or Web of trust, a crowdsourced Internet website reputation rating tool

== Government and political organizations ==
- Trust (British political party), formed by Stuart Wheeler in 2010
- Trust (Greek political party), a Muslim party in the Rhodope region
- Trust (parliamentary group), a Ukrainian parliamentary group and political party
- NHS trust, a public health organization
- Operation Trust, a Soviet counter-intelligence operation

== Other uses ==
- Trust, North Carolina, a community in the US
- Trust (spider), a genus of spiders in the family Theridiidae

== See also ==
- Trieste United States Troops, a 1947–1953 US Army occupation unit
- Trust Company (disambiguation)
- Trustee (disambiguation)
- Trusteeship (disambiguation)
- Trustor (disambiguation)
- Truss (disambiguation)
- National Trust (disambiguation)
- TRST (disambiguation)
