= TRST =

TRST, Trst, or variations, may refer to:

- Trieste (Slovene: Trst), a city in Italy
- Trst (album), stylized as TRST, the 2012 debut album for Canadian synth-pop band TR/ST
- TR/ST, Canadian electropop band
- Rai Radio Trst A, aka Radio Trst, Slovene-language radio station in Trieste
- TRST (test reset), a command signal found in JTAG
- TRST (market research), Toy Retail Survey Tracking, associated with the NPD Group

== See also ==
- Tryst (disambiguation)
- Trust (disambiguation)
- Trist (set index)
