= Mortgage modification =

Legal process affecting mortgages

Mortgage modification is a process where the terms of a mortgage are modified outside the original terms of the contract agreed to by the lender and borrower (i.e. mortgagee and mortgagor in mortgage states; Trustee and Trustor in Trust Deed states). In general, any loan can be modified, and the process is referred to as loan modification or debt rescheduling.

== Background ==
In the normal progression of a mortgage, payments are made according to the loan documents until the mortgage is paid in full (or paid off). The lender holds a lien on the property, and if the borrower sells the property before the mortgage is paid-off, the unpaid balance of the mortgage is paid to the lender to release the lien. Any change to the mortgage terms is a modification. Changes may include any of the following: a reduction of the yield (commonly referred to as the interest rate), an extension of the payment term, such as extending a 30-year term to a 40-year term, or a reduction of the principal balance of the loan.

== In the United States ==
Following the 2007 real estate recession, the government mandated the program, Making Home Affordable (MHA), and its loan modification aspect, Home Affordable Modification Program (HAMP) became the answer for both the struggling borrower and the lender. The lender is motivated to offer modification under this program by the expectation that a loan in default will become a performing (current) loan which will be more valuable than the proceeds obtained from a foreclosure sale, along with receipt of financial incentives from the government. The borrower, on the other hand, receives a fixed interest rate, a lower loan payment, often an extended term, and sometimes a principal reduction (if the property is upside down).

== In Canada ==
The emergency loan-modification options give homeowners the potential to extend amortization periods on their homes if experiencing significant financial hardship or foreclosure. These options can offer extensions up to a 40-year amortization, if a 15-year extension is granted on a previous 25-year amortization mortgage.

== See also ==
- Home Affordable Modification Program
- Loan modification company
