= Tryst =

Tryst may refer to:

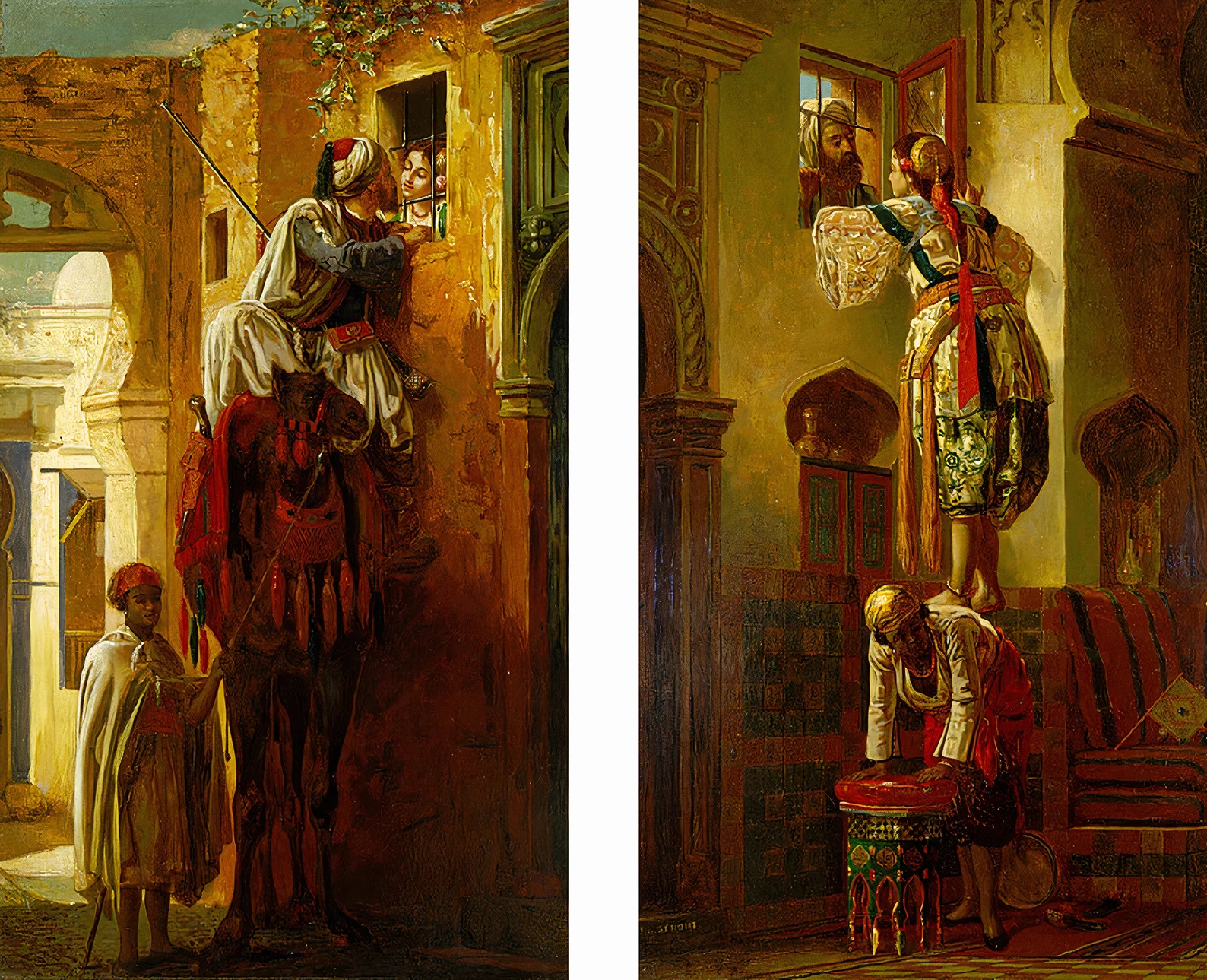
The Tryst painting by Jean-Léon Gérôme.

== Art and entertainment ==
- Tryst (novel), a 1939 novel by Elswyth Thane
- Tryst (play), a 2006 play by Karoline Leach
- Tryst (album), a 2019 studio album by Kate Ceberano and Paul Grabowsky
- "Tryst", a song by John Ireland from his 1928 composition Two Songs, 1928
- Trysts, a 2001 collection of short stories by Steve Berman

== Other uses ==
- Falkirk Tryst, a former livestock market in Scotland
- Tryst, a defunct nightclub at the Wynn Las Vegas hotel
- Tryst with Destiny, a 1947 speech by Indian Prime Minister Jawaharlal Nehru

== See also ==
- Cinq à sept
- Trist
- Trysting tree
