= External debt =

Liabilities owed to nonresidents by residents

A country's gross external debt (or foreign debt) is the liabilities that are owed to nonresidents by residents. The debtors can be governments, corporations or citizens. External debt may be denominated in domestic or foreign currency. It includes amounts owed to private commercial banks, foreign governments, or international financial institutions such as the International Monetary Fund (IMF) and the World Bank.

External debt measures an economy's obligations to make future payments and, therefore, is an indicator of a country's vulnerability to solvency and liquidity problems. Another useful indicator is the net external debt position, which equals gross external debt minus external assets in the form of debt instruments. A related concept is the net international investment position (net IIP). Provided that debt securities are measured at market value, the net external debt position equals the net IIP excluding equity and investment fund shares, financial derivatives, and employee stock options.

== Definition ==
According to the International Monetary Fund's External Debt Statistics: Guide for Compilers and Users, "Gross external debt, at any given time, is the outstanding amount of those actual current, and not contingent, liabilities that require payment(s) of principal and/or interest by the debtor at some point(s) in the future and that are owed to nonresidents by residents of an economy."

In this definition, the IMF defines the key elements as follows:

Outstanding and actual current liabilities
Debt liabilities include arrears of both principal and interest.
Principal and interest
When the cost of borrowing is paid periodically, as commonly occurs, it is known as an interest payment. All other payments of economic value by the debtor to the creditor that reduce the principal amount outstanding are known as principal payments. However, the definition of external debt does not distinguish between principal payments or interest payments, or payments for both. Also, the definition does not specify that the timing of the future payments of principal and/or interest need be known for a liability to be classified as debt.
Residence
To qualify as external debt, the debt liabilities must be owed by a resident to a nonresident. Residence is determined by where the debtor and creditor have their centers of economic interest—typically, where they are ordinarily located—and not by their nationality.
Current and not contingent
Contingent liabilities are not included in the definition of external debt. These are defined as arrangements under which one or more conditions must be fulfilled before a financial transaction takes place. However, from the viewpoint of understanding vulnerability, there is analytical interest in the potential impact of contingent liabilities on an economy and on particular institutional sectors, such as the government.

Generally, external debt is classified into four heads:

(1) public and publicly guaranteed debt;
(2) private non-guaranteed credits;
(3) central bank deposits; and
(4) loans due to the IMF.

However, the exact treatment varies from country to country. For example, while Egypt maintains this four-head classification, in India it is classified in seven heads:

(a) Multilateral,
(b) Bilateral,
(c) IMF loans,
(d) Trade credit,
(e) Commercial borrowings,
(f) Non-resident Indian and person of Indian origin deposits,
(g) Rupee debt, and
(h) NPR debt.

== External debt sustainability ==
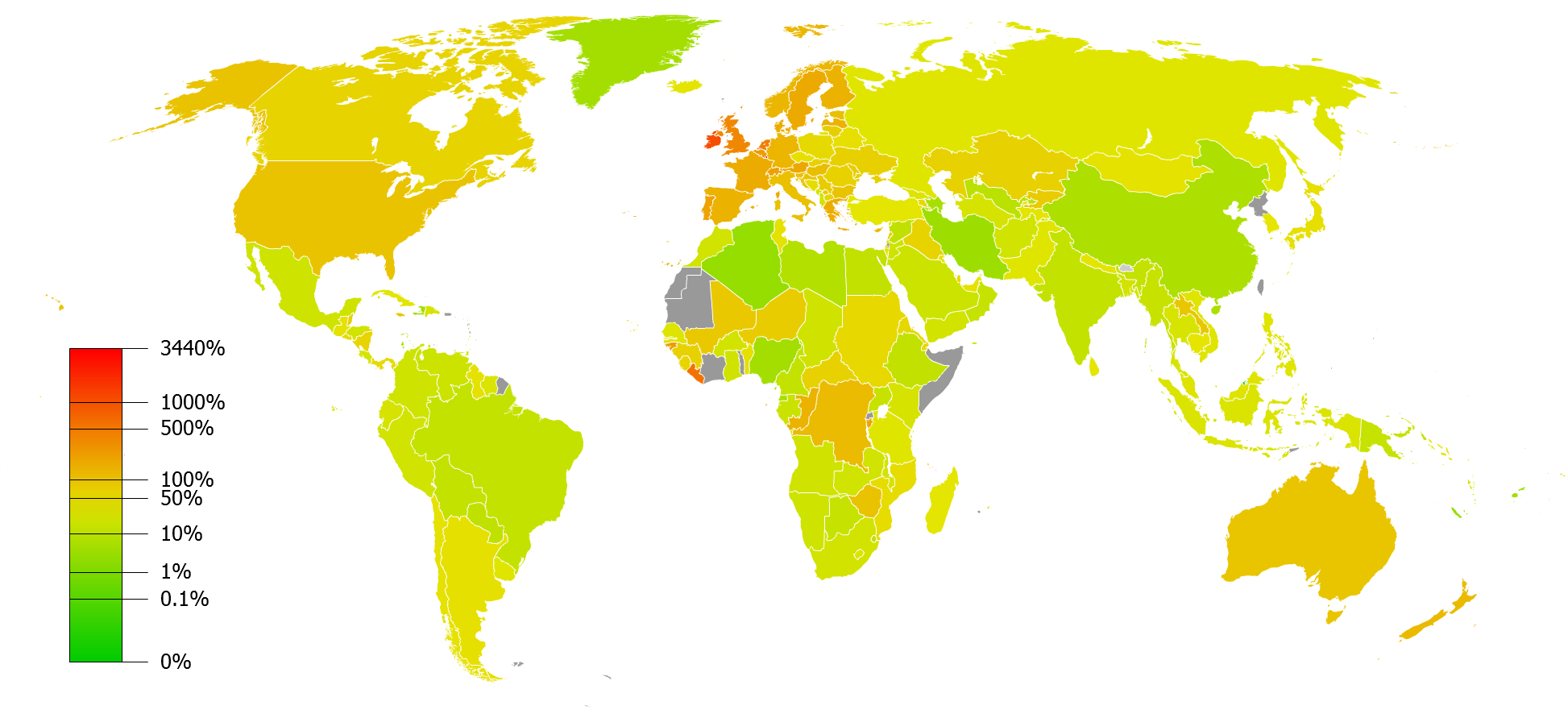
Map of countries by external debt as a percentage of GDP

Total debt service as % of exports of goods, services and primary income in 2017

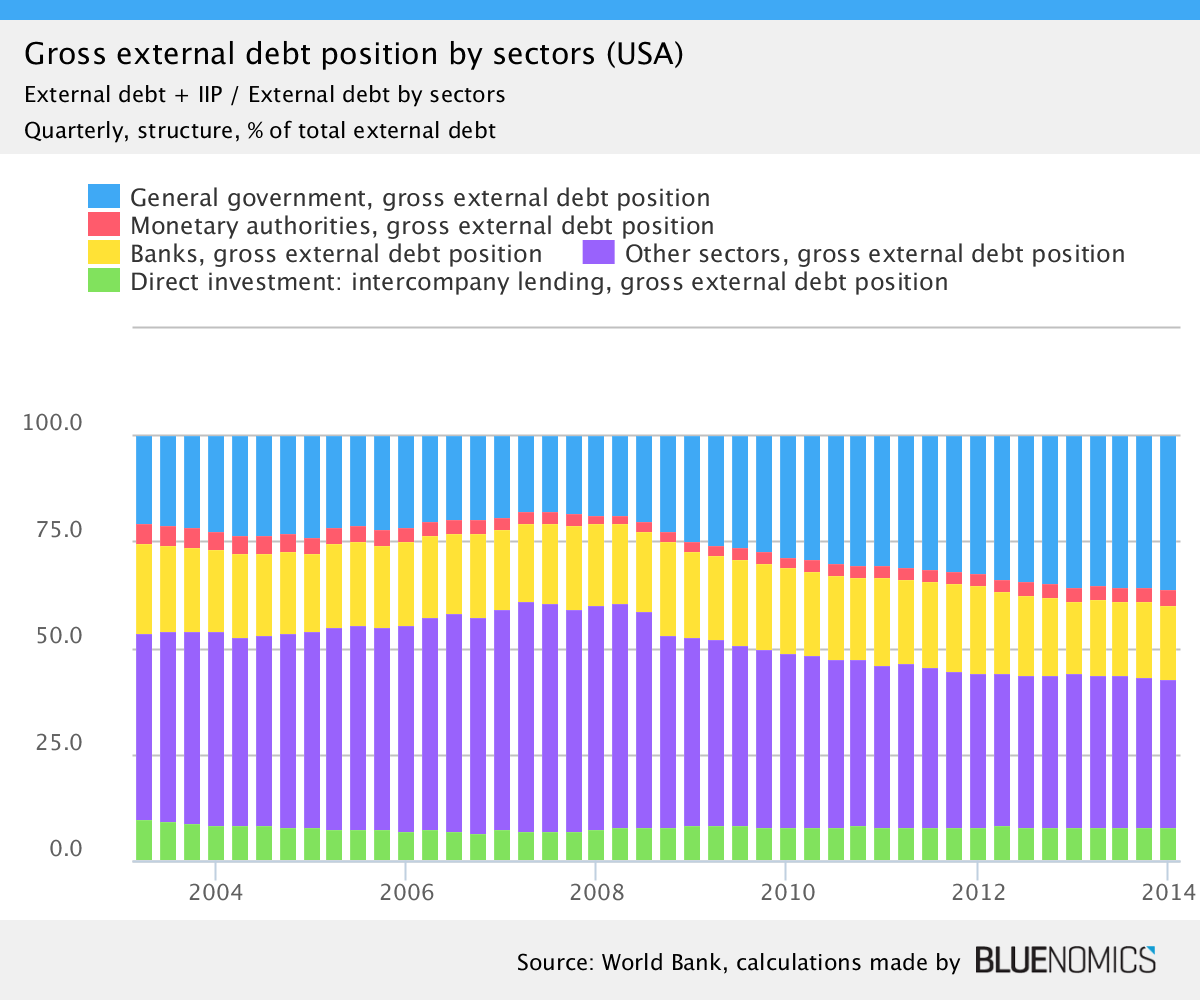
Share of U.S. gross external debt by debtors

Sustainable debt is the level of debt which allows a debtor country to meet its current and future debt service obligations in full, without recourse to further debt relief or rescheduling, avoiding accumulation of arrears, while allowing an acceptable level of economic growth.

External-debt-sustainability analysis is generally conducted in the context of medium-term scenarios. These scenarios are numerical evaluations that take account of expectations of the behavior of economic variables and other factors to determine the conditions under which debt and other indicators would stabilize at reasonable levels, the major risks to the economy, and the need and scope for policy adjustment. In these analyses, macroeconomic uncertainties, such as the outlook for the current account, and policy uncertainties, such as for fiscal policy, tend to dominate the medium-term outlook.

The World Bank and IMF hold that "a country can be said to achieve external debt sustainability if it can meet its current and future external debt service obligations in full, without recourse to debt rescheduling or the accumulation of arrears and without compromising growth". According to these two institutions, "bringing the net present value (NPV) of external public debt down to about 150 percent of a country's exports or 250 percent of a country's revenues" would help eliminating this "critical barrier to longer-term debt sustainability". High external debt is believed to be harmful for the economy.

=== Indicators ===
There are various indicators for determining a sustainable level of external debt. While each has its own advantage and peculiarity to deal with particular situations, there is no unanimous opinion amongst economists as to a sole indicator. These indicators are primarily in the nature of ratios—i.e., comparison between two heads and the relation thereon and thus facilitate the policy makers in their external debt management exercise. These indicators can be thought of as measures of the country's "solvency" in that they consider the stock of debt at certain time in relation to the country's ability to generate resources to repay the outstanding balance.

Examples of debt burden indicators include the

(a) Debt-to-GDP ratio,
(b) foreign debt to exports ratio,
(c) government debt to current fiscal revenue ratio etc.

This set of indicators also covers the structure of the outstanding debt, including:

(d) Share of foreign debt,
(e) Short-term debt, and
(f) Concessional debt ("loans with an original grant element of 25 percent or more") in the total debt stock.

A second set of indicators focuses on the short-term liquidity requirements of the country with respect to its debt service obligations. These indicators are not only useful early-warning signs of debt service problems, but also highlight the impact of the inter-temporal trade-offs arising from past borrowing decisions. Examples of liquidity monitoring indicators include the

(a) Debt service to GDP ratio,
(b) Foreign debt service to exports ratio,
(c) Government debt service to current fiscal revenue ratio

The final indicators are more forward-looking, as they point out how the debt burden will evolve over time, given the current stock of data and average interest rate. The dynamic ratios show how the debt-burden ratios would change in the absence of repayments or new disbursements, indicating the stability of the debt burden. An example of a dynamic ratio is the ratio of the average interest rate on outstanding debt to the growth rate of nominal GDP.

== See also ==
- Eurodad
- Jubilee Debt Coalition
- List of countries by external debt
- Net international investment position
- Odious debt
- Government debt
- Sovereign default
- The Accumulation of Capital
- Debt of developing countries
- Global debt
