= Jabulani Mabuza =

Eswatini politician (born 1972)

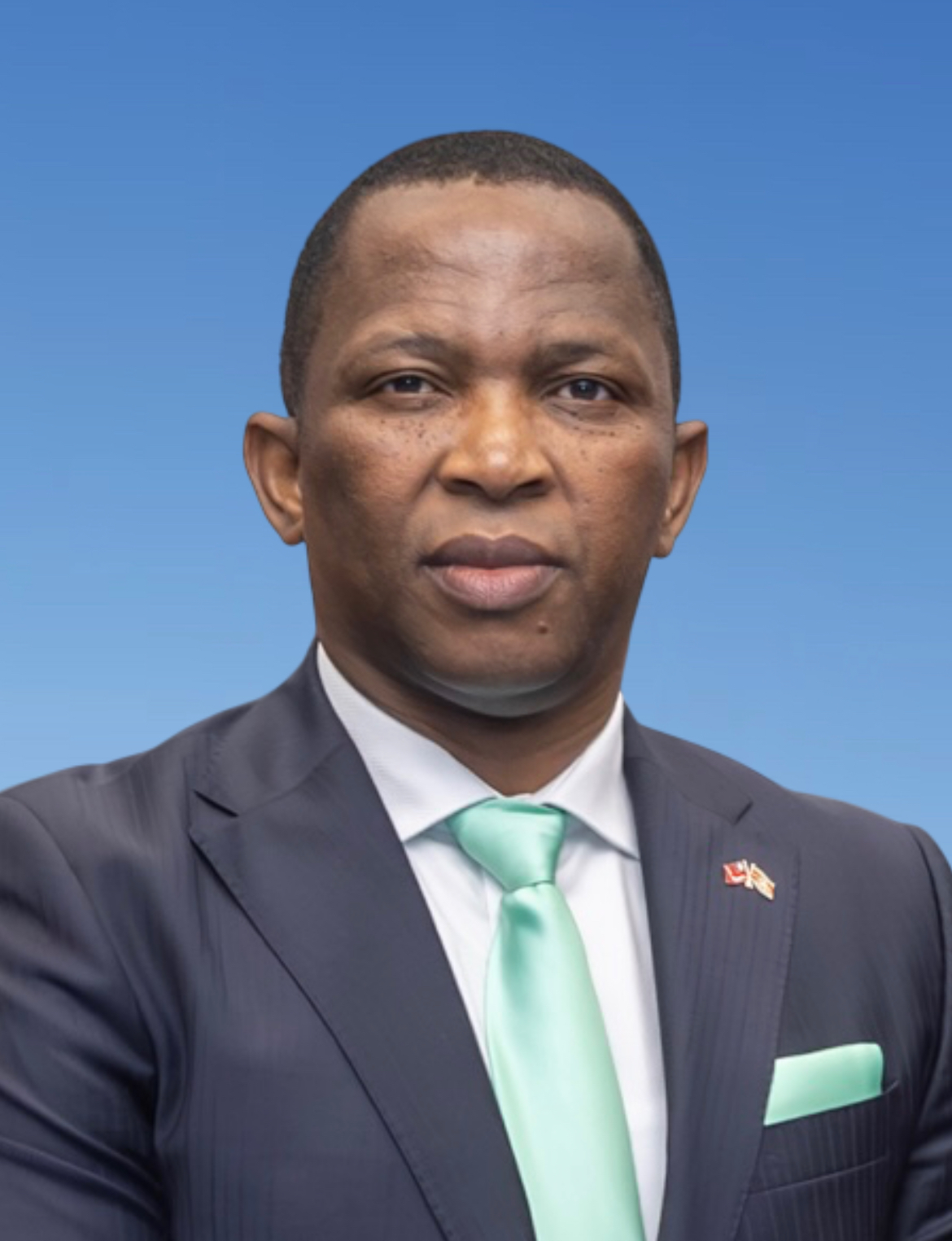
- Official portrait, 2025

15th Speaker of the House of Assembly
- Incumbent
- Assumed office 6 October 2023
- Monarch: Mswati III
- Preceded by: Petros Mavimbela

Member of the House of Assembly
- Incumbent
- Assumed office September 2018
- Constituency: Piggs Peak

Personal details
- Born: 22 July 1972 (age 53)
- Party: Independent
- Occupation: Businessman · politician

Jabulani Clement Mabuza (born 22 July 1972) is an Eswatini politician and businessman serving as the Speaker of the House of Assembly of Eswatini since October 2023.

== Biography ==
Mabuza was born on 22 July 1972. He has at least two brothers, including former House of Assembly of Eswatini member Mduduzi Bacede Mabuza who was imprisoned for pro-democracy protests. Mabuza, who is married, started a business in 2003 with his wife known as "Buy Cash Hardware". He said that he started the business "with the aim of creating employment and to serve the nation by bringing goods and services closer to people." The hardware store chain had about 18 locations as of 2021, with many being in rural areas, and employs several hundred citizens. Due to the title of his business, Mabuza is often called by the nickname "Buy Cash."

Mabuza ran in the 2018 Swazi general election and won a seat in the House of Assembly to represent the town of Piggs Peak, receiving 4,736 votes, 70.1% of the electorate. Soon after being elected, he was appointed to the position of Minister of Commerce, Industry and Trade, later being moved the position of Minister of Agriculture November 2018. In 2021, his stores were the victim of several arson attacks, with several branches being burned down. By 2022, Mabuza had added the duty of Acting Minister of Natural Resources and Energy. He also served for a time as the acting deputy prime minister.

Mabuza ran for re-election as part of the 2023 Swazi general election, winning the Piggs Peak primary election and then winning by an overwhelming margin in the general election, receiving 4,467 votes, nearly seven times more than Sandile Menano Dlamini, who placed second with 701 votes. Mabuza and Madala Mhlanga were the top two candidates for the post of Speaker of the House of Assembly of Eswatini, with Mabuza receiving the endorsement of King Mswati III and emerging victorious with the votes of 41 of the MPs.
