= Conservation and restoration of immovable cultural property =

Process of preservation of historically significant buildings

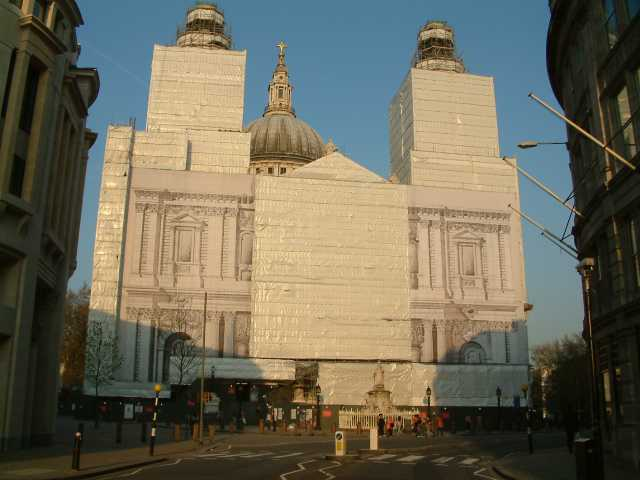
St Paul's Cathedral, London, clad for refurbishment — in this case, cleaning the exterior.

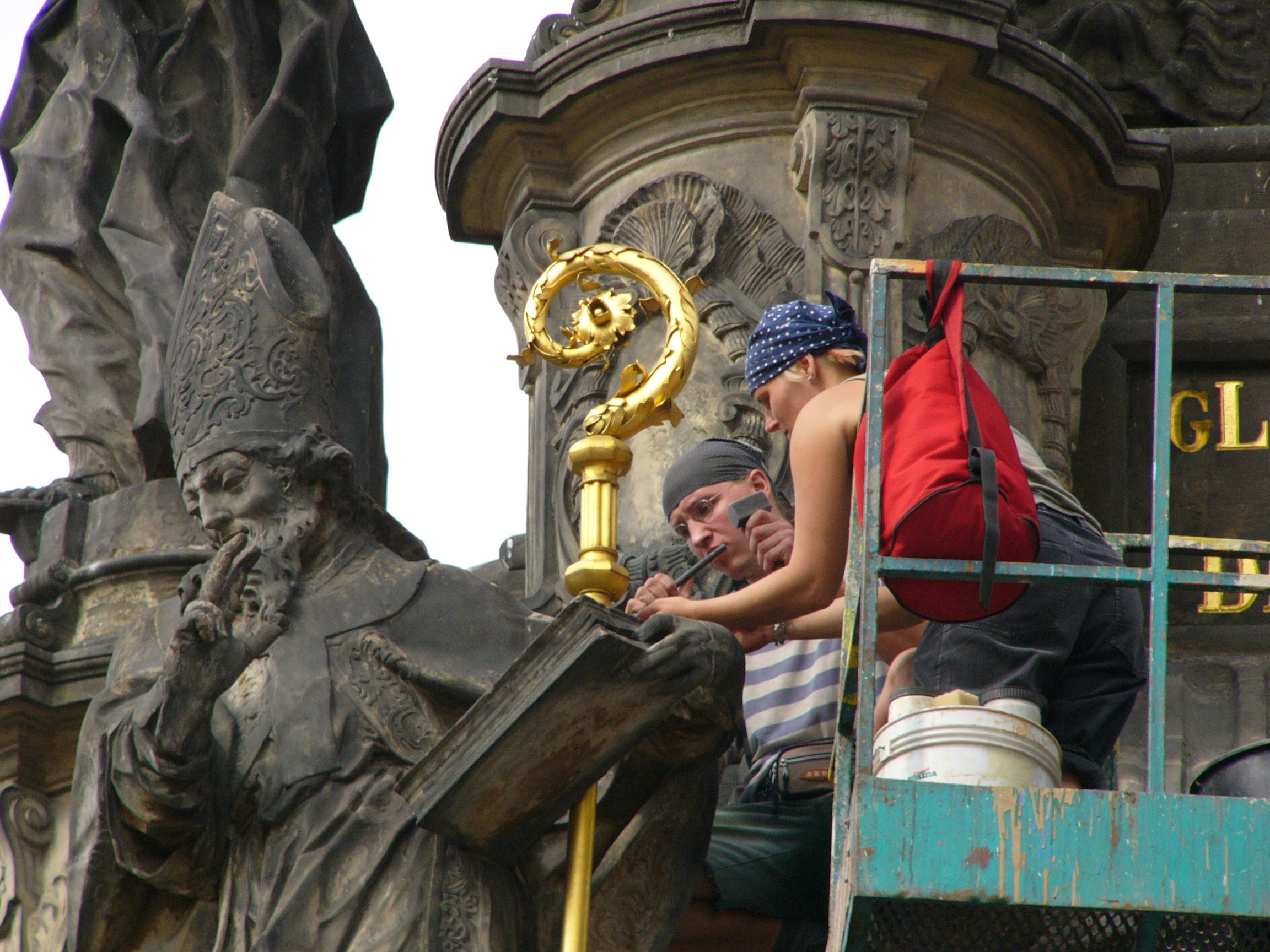
Revision and conservation of Holy Trinity Column in Olomouc (Czech Republic) in 2006.

Conservation and restoration of immovable cultural property describes the process through which the material, historical, and design integrity of any immovable cultural property are prolonged through carefully planned interventions. The individual engaged in this pursuit is known as an architectural conservator-restorer. Decisions of when and how to engage in an intervention are critical to the ultimate conservation-restoration of cultural heritage. Ultimately, the decision is value based: a combination of artistic, contextual, and informational values is normally considered. In some cases, a decision to not intervene may be the most appropriate choice.

== Definitions ==
=== Narrow definition ===
The Conservation Architect must consider factors that deal with issues of prolonging the life and preserving the integrity of architectural character, such as form and style, and/or its constituent materials, such as stone, brick, glass, metal, and wood. In this sense, the term refers to the "professional use of a combination of science, art, craft, and technology as a preservation tool" and is allied with – and often equated to – its parent fields, of historic environment conservation and art conservation.

=== Broad definition ===
In addition to the design and art/science definition described above, architectural conservation also refers to issues of identification, policy, regulation, and advocacy associated with the entirety of the cultural and built environment. This broader scope recognizes that society has mechanisms to identify and value historic cultural resources, create laws to protect these resources, and develop policies and management plans for interpretation, protection, and education. Typically this process operates as a specialized aspect of a society's planning system, and its practitioners are termed built or historic environment conservation professionals.

=== Functional definition ===
Architectural conservation is the process by which individuals or groups attempt to protect valued buildings from unwanted change.

== History of the architectural conservation movement ==
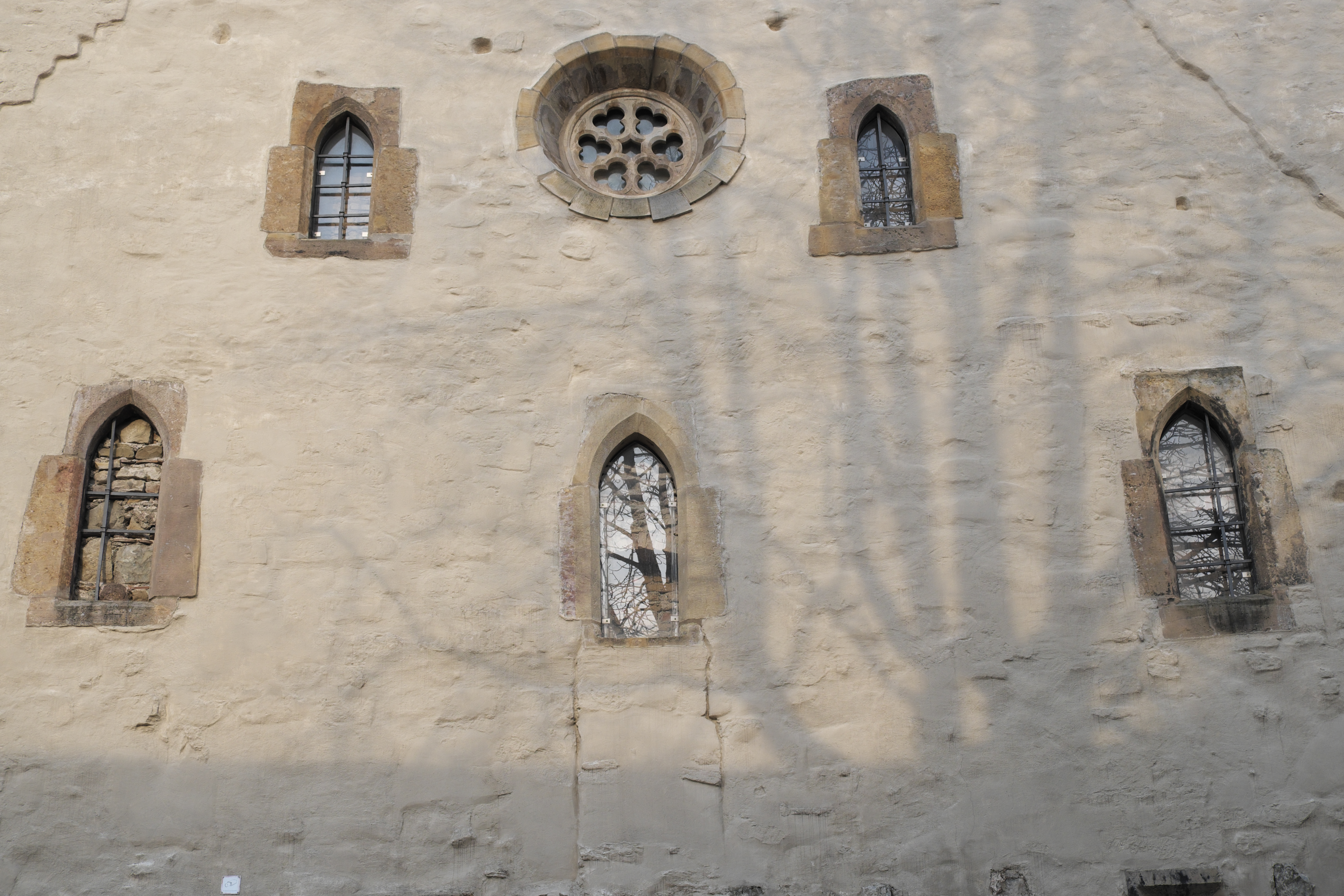
Windows, c.1270, on the carefully preserved Old Synagogue, Erfurt in Germany

As a movement, architectural conservation in general, and the preservation of ancient structures specifically, gained momentum during the 18th and 19th centuries. It was a response to modernism and its corresponding architectural perspective, which eschewed sentimental attachment to old buildings and structures in favor of technological and architectural progress and change. Prior to this time most of the ancient buildings that were still standing had only survived because they either had significant cultural or religious import, or they had yet to be discovered.

The growth of the architectural conservation movement took place at a time of significant archaeological discovery and scientific advancement. Those educated in the field began to see various examples of architecture as either being "correct" or "incorrect". Because of this, two schools of thought began to emerge within the field of building conservation.

Preservation/Conservation were used interchangeably to refer to the architectural school of thought that either encouraged measures that would protect and maintain buildings in their current state, or would prevent further damage and deterioration to them. This school of thought saw the original design of old buildings as correct in and of themselves. Two of the main proponents of preservation and conservation in the 19th century were art critic John Ruskin and artist William Morris.

Restoration was the conservationist school of thought that believed historic buildings could be improved, and sometimes even completed, using current day materials, design, and techniques. In this way it is very similar to the Modernist architectural theory, except it does not advocate the destruction of ancient structures. One of the most ardent supporters of this school of thought in the 19th century was the French architect Eugène Viollet-le-Duc. Victorian restoration of medieval churches was widespread in England and elsewhere, with results that were deplored at the time by William Morris and are now widely regretted.

== Current treatments ==
The Department of the Interior of the United States defined the following treatment approaches to architectural conservation:

- Preservation, "places a high premium on the retention of all historic fabric through conservation, maintenance and repair. It reflects a building's continuum over time, through successive occupancies, and the respectful changes and alterations that are made."
- Rehabilitation "emphasizes the retention and repair of historic materials, but more latitude is provided for replacement because it is assumed the property is more deteriorated prior to work. (Both Preservation and Rehabilitation standards focus attention on the preservation of those materials, features, finishes, spaces, and spatial relationships that, together, give a property its historic character." See also adaptive reuse.
- Restoration "focuses on the retention of materials from the most significant time in a property's history, while permitting the removal of materials from other periods."
- Reconstruction, "establishes limited opportunities to re-create a non-surviving site, landscape, building, structure, or object in all new materials."

Other nations recognize some or all of these as potential treatments for historic structures. Canada recognizes preservation, rehabilitation, and restoration. The Burra Charter, for Australia, identifies preservation, restoration, and reconstruction.

== Common architectural conservation/preservation problems ==
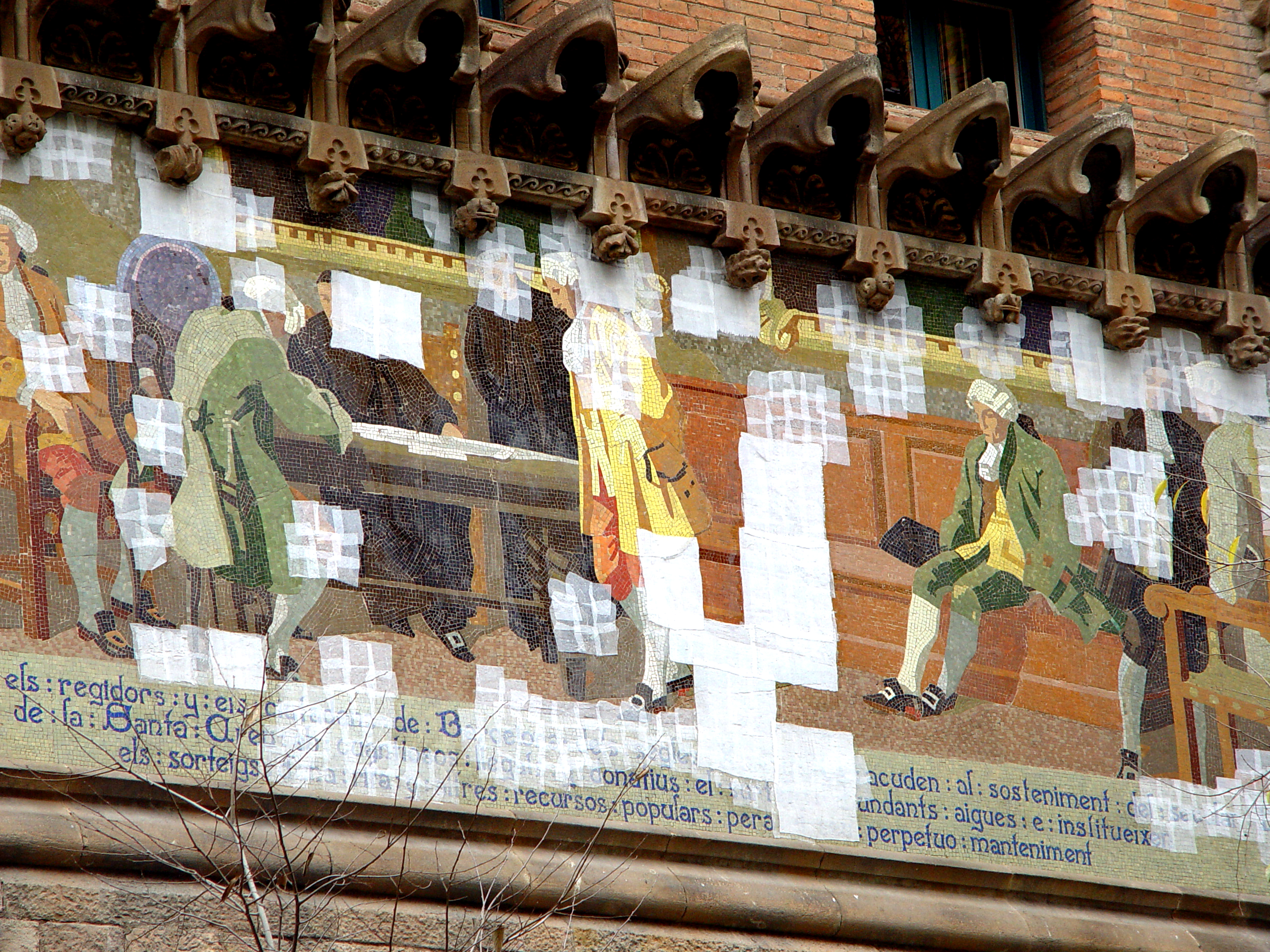
Conservation patches on mosaics wall of Hospital de la Santa Creu I Sant Pau (Barcelona)

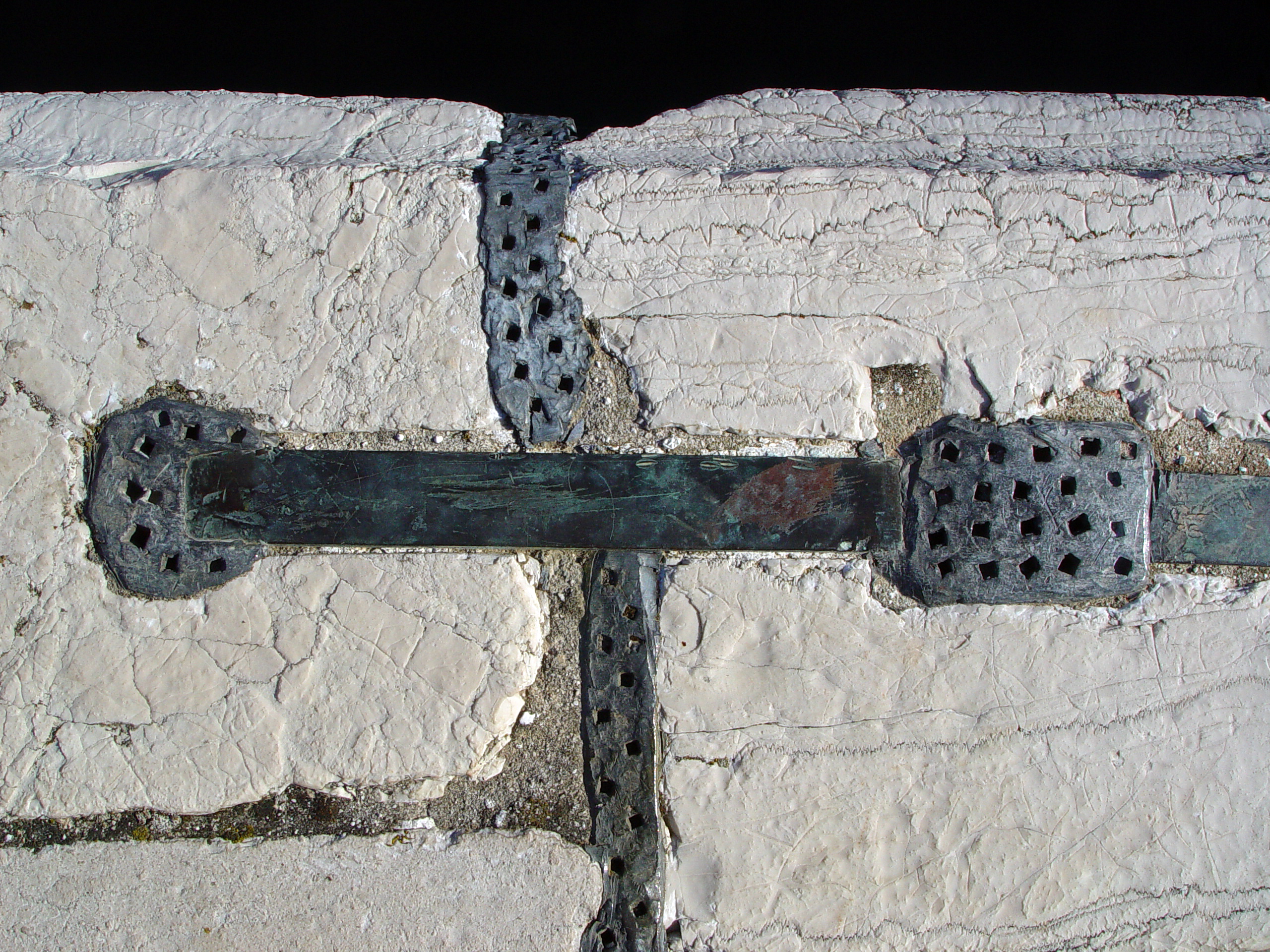
Punched lead cast in a Venice bridge wall fixing the hard-metal connecting bar

The earliest building materials used by ancient peoples, such as wood and mud, were organic. Organic materials were used because they were plentiful and renewable. Unfortunately, the organic materials used were also very susceptible to the two most significant impediments to preservation and conservation: the elements and life (both human and animal). Over time inorganic materials like brick, stone, metal, concrete, and terra cotta began to be used by ancient people instead of organic ones, due to their durability. In fact, we know that these materials are durable because many ancient structures that are composed of them, even some built as far back as the Bronze Age, like Egypt's Great Pyramids, still stand today.

Ancient buildings such as the Egyptian pyramids, the Roman Colosseum, and the Parthenon face common preservation issues. The most prominent factors affecting these structures are the environment, pollution, and tourism.

As the Earth's climate patterns change, so too do the environmental conditions governing these buildings. For example, the Colosseum has already faced lightning, fire, and earthquakes. The changing climate increases the accumulation of salt crystals on the outside of monuments like the Colosseum and the Parthenon. This phenomenon increases the deterioration of these buildings.

The salt crystals further contribute to the black effect that man-made pollution has on these buildings. The Parthenon is especially exposed and many of the remaining marbles are eroding to the point that they may no longer be identifiable. The pollution from corrosive agents in the air has also attributed to this deterioration.

The third factor affecting ancient building conservation is tourism. While tourism provides both economical and cultural benefits, it can also be destructive. The Egyptian tomb of Seti the 1st is currently off limits to the public due to the deterioration that has been caused by tourists. The pyramids in Giza have also encountered problems due to large numbers of tourists; more tourists mean greater humidity and water presence, which can lead to erosion.

All of the above factors complicate the conservation options available to treat these buildings.

== Conservation process ==
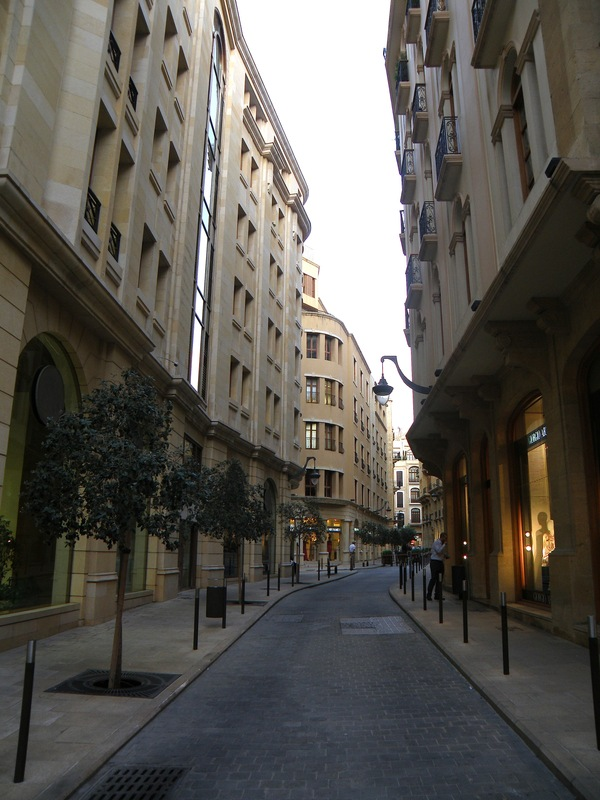
A preserved historical alleyway in Beirut Central District

=== Assessment ===
The first step in any building conservation project is a sensitive assessment of its history and merits. As noted architect Donald Insall states, "Every building has its own biography. A knowledge of the whole life of a building brings an essential understanding of its features and its problems. He gives the Parthenon in Athens as an example; built between 447 and 432 BCE to serve as a temple dedicated to the goddess Athena, its purpose over time changed to Christian church, mosque, and powder magazine before it became one of the most famous tourist attractions in the world.

Once the assessment is complete, the next step is a thorough measured survey with a tape, rod and level. Modern measuring techniques, such as photogrammetry (the use of aerial photographs to make maps and surveys) and stereophotogrammetry, are also used today to increase accuracy. Once the measurements are complete, there is an analysis of the structural stability of the building and its living pattern of movement. No building is permanently still; soil and wind can affect building stability and need to be documented. Finally, the architect or surveyor tests the electrical connections, plumbing, and other utilities present in the building (this is more for historic and re-purposed buildings). For both ancient and historic buildings, lightning conductors and fire-fighting equipment are checked to make sure they can provide sufficient protection.

At the end of this assessment process, the conservator will analyze all the collected data and decide on a conservation plan based on available funding sources..

=== Treatment ===
The phrase covers a wide span of activities, from the cleaning of the interior or exterior of a building — as took place at St Paul's Cathedral in London — to the rebuilding of damaged or derelict buildings, such as the restoration of the Windsor Great Hall in Windsor Castle after a destructive fire in 1992. The 1985–1989 removal of 38 layers of paint and the cleaning and repair of the exterior sandstone walls of the White House in the United States are an example of building restoration.

Buildings are structures which have, from time to time, particular purposes. They require ongoing maintenance to prevent them falling into disrepair as a result of the ravages of time and use. Building restoration can be thought of as that set of activities which are greater than year-to-year maintenance, but which by retaining the building are less than a demolition and the construction of a new building.

Not all building conservation seeks to follow the original design of the building. It is reasonably commonplace for the shell of a building — its external walls — to be retained whilst an entirely new building is constructed within. This approach is also referred to as adaptive reuse.

Although techniques of architectural conservation are improving, the action of cleaning or repairing buildings can, with hindsight, be seen to cause problems that at the time were unforeseen. A good example is the unrestrained use of sandblasting to clean smog deposits from soft-stoned buildings — a technique employed in the UK in the 1960s and 1970s — which has damaged the external faces of stonework to the extent that in some cases, later, the stonework has needed to be replaced. Contemporary building codes recognize such problems, and (it is to be hoped) mitigate poor outcomes.

==== Case example: Ancient stone structures ====
Most ancient buildings are constructed of stone and have survived from antiquity as a result of the stability of this building material. However, stone can deteriorate rapidly without protection, particularly in the modern era of pollution and climate change.

== Public awareness and outreach to promote architectural conservation ==
There are many organizations that work to raise public awareness of the necessity to preserve ancient and historic buildings and areas, across communities, users and government. In addition to promoting the cultural value of these buildings, and encouraging appropriate policies and strategies for conservation, the organizations can help in raising the required funding to implement conservation initiatives and plans, and often serve as a link between the community and local/federal governments to advance conservation projects. A brief list of architectural conservation organizations is below:

- AIC-ASG (The American Institute for Conservation – Architectural Specialty Group)
- The Institute of Historic Building Conservation (in the United Kingdom)
- The Society for the Protection of Ancient Buildings (in the United Kingdom)
- UNESCO (United Nations Educational, Scientific, and Cultural Organizations) World Heritage Centre
- Council of Europe, Architectural and Archaeological Heritage
- APT (Association for Preservation Technology International)
- ICOMOS (International Council on Monuments and Sites)
- The International Scientific Committee on the Analysis and Restoration of Structures of Architectural Heritage
- Historic England
- ASHPS (American Scenic and Historic Preservation Society)
- CPS (Commons Preservation Society)
- HABS (Historic American Buildings Survey)
- HUD (US Department of Housing and Urban Development)
- ICCROM (International Centre for the Study of the Preservation and Restoration of Cultural Property)
- IUCN (International Union for the Conservation of Nature and Natural Resources)
- NPA (National Park Service)
- TPRM (Trustees of the Public Reservations in Massachusetts)
- INTACH (Indian National Trust for Art and Cultural Heritage)

== Restoration ==
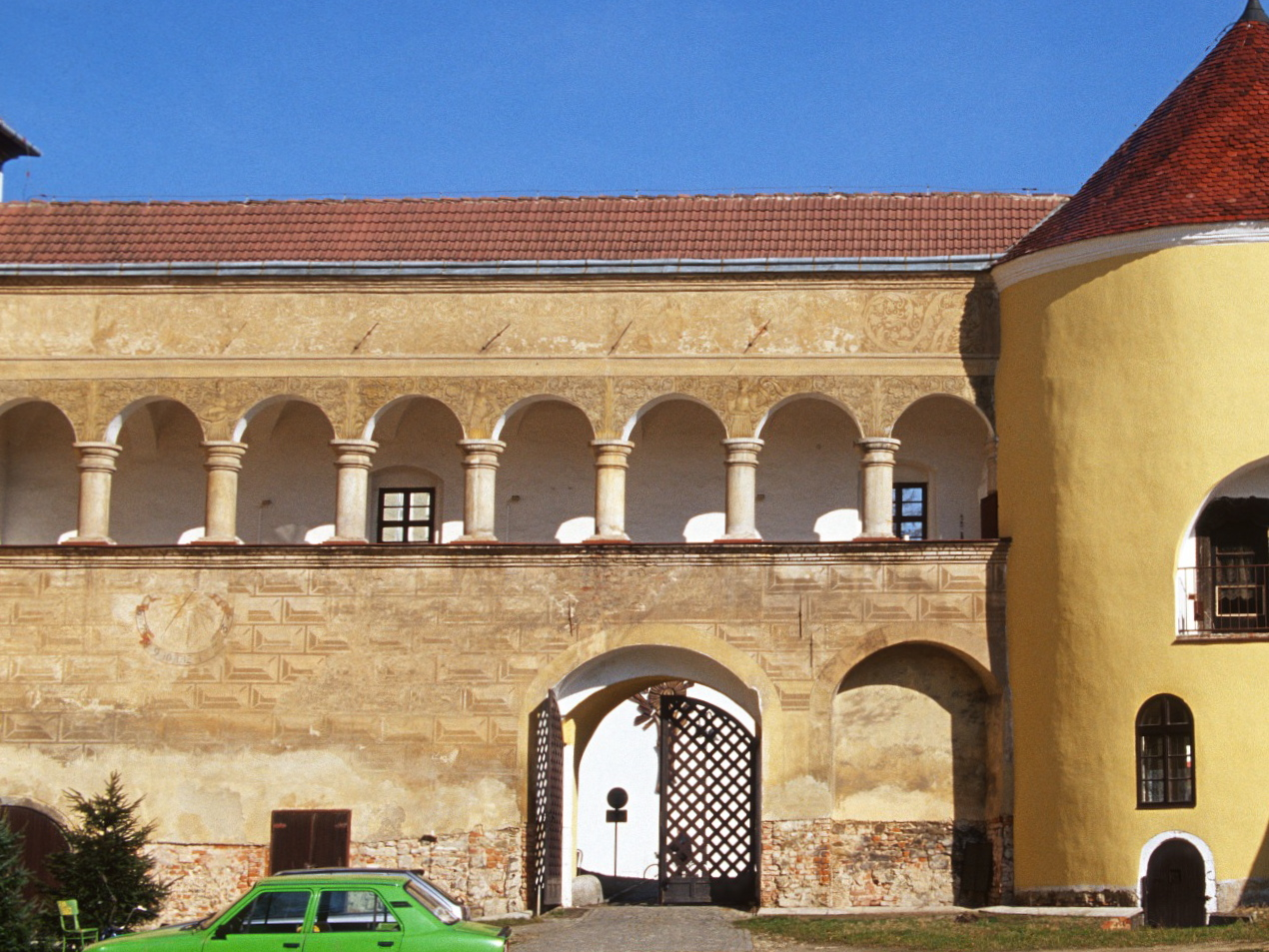
Before restoration (2001)

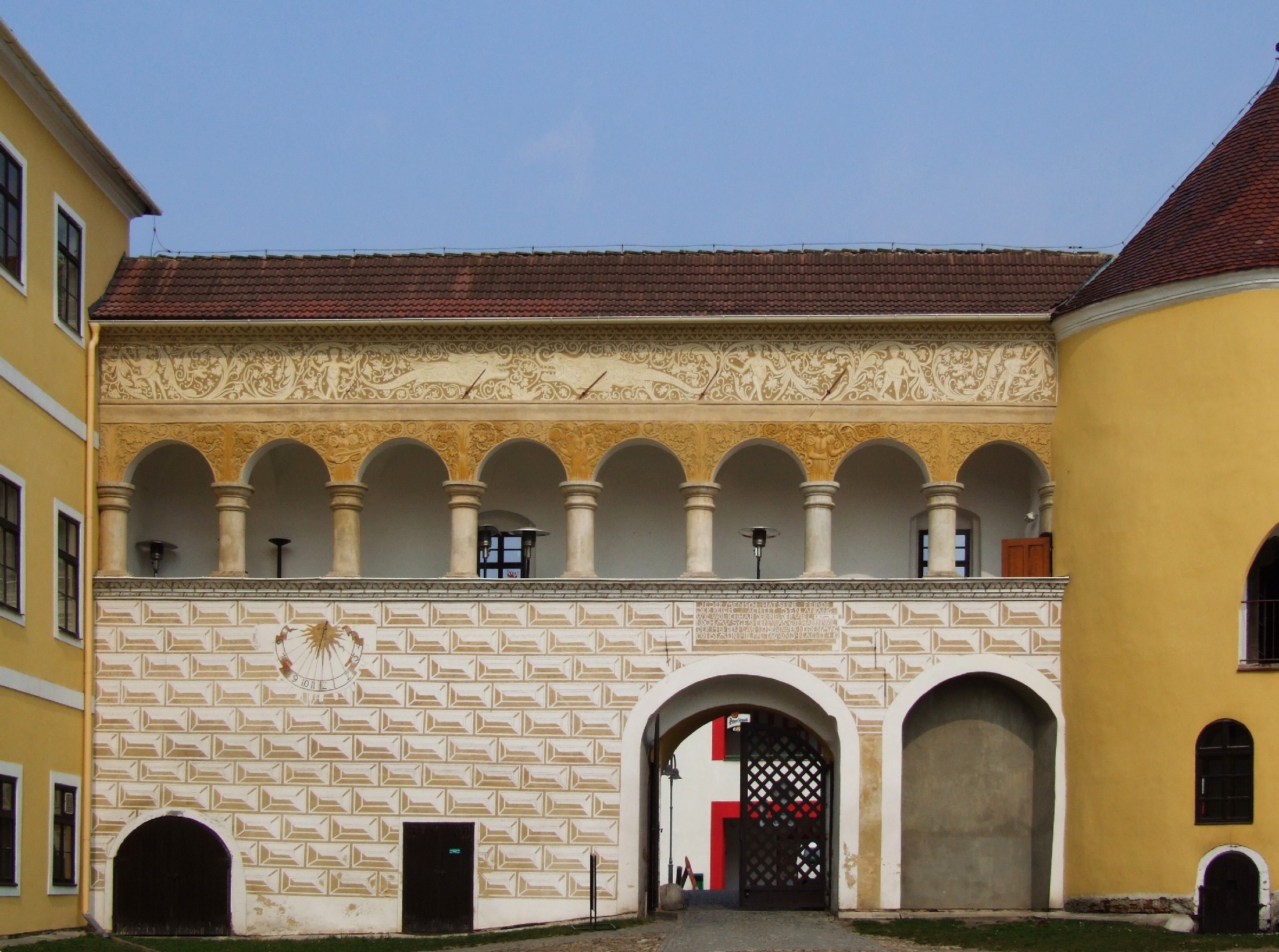
After restoration (2009)

Castle gate of Krnov, Czech Republic

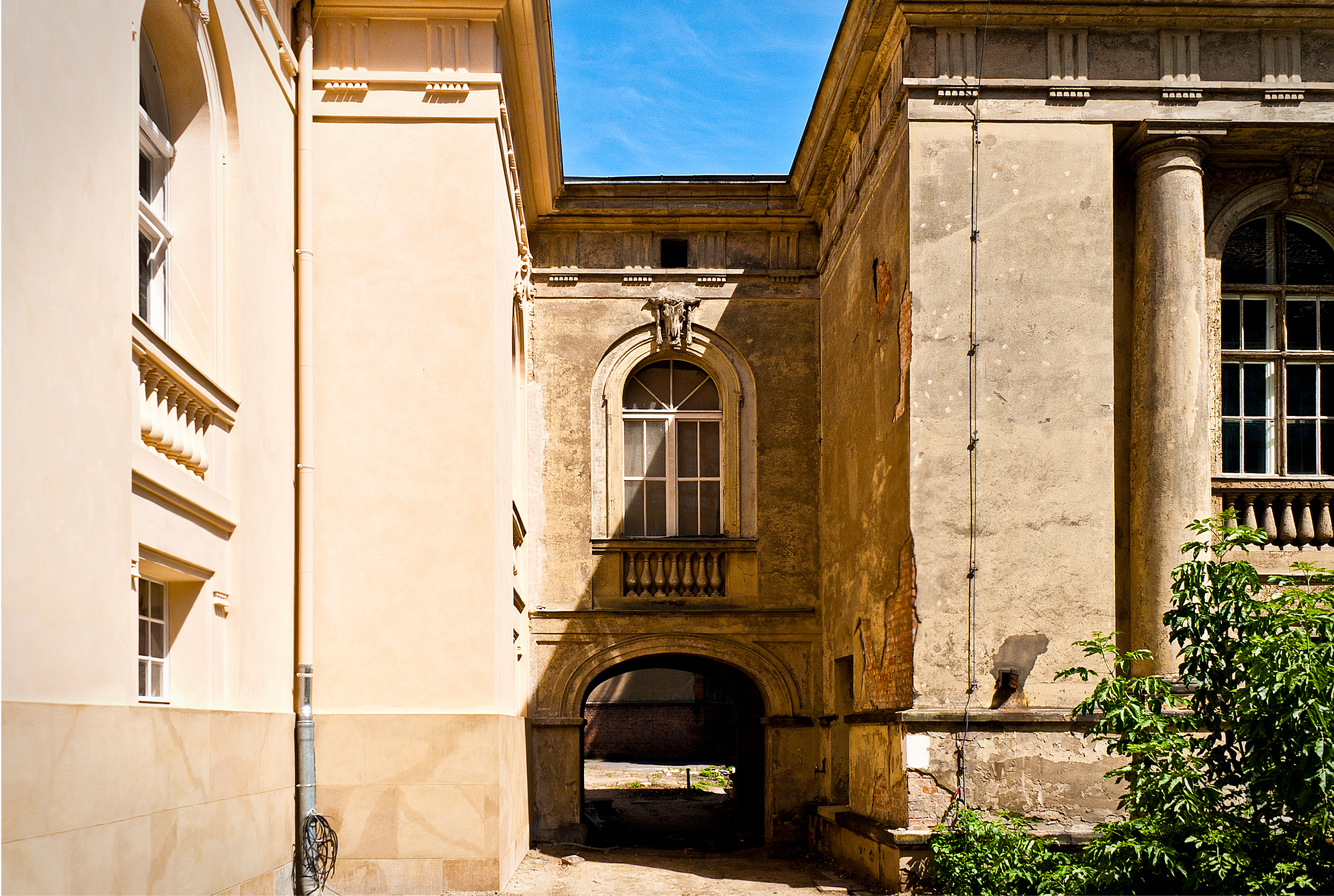
The Veterinary School's Anatomical Theatre of the Humboldt University of Berlin before and after its restoration.

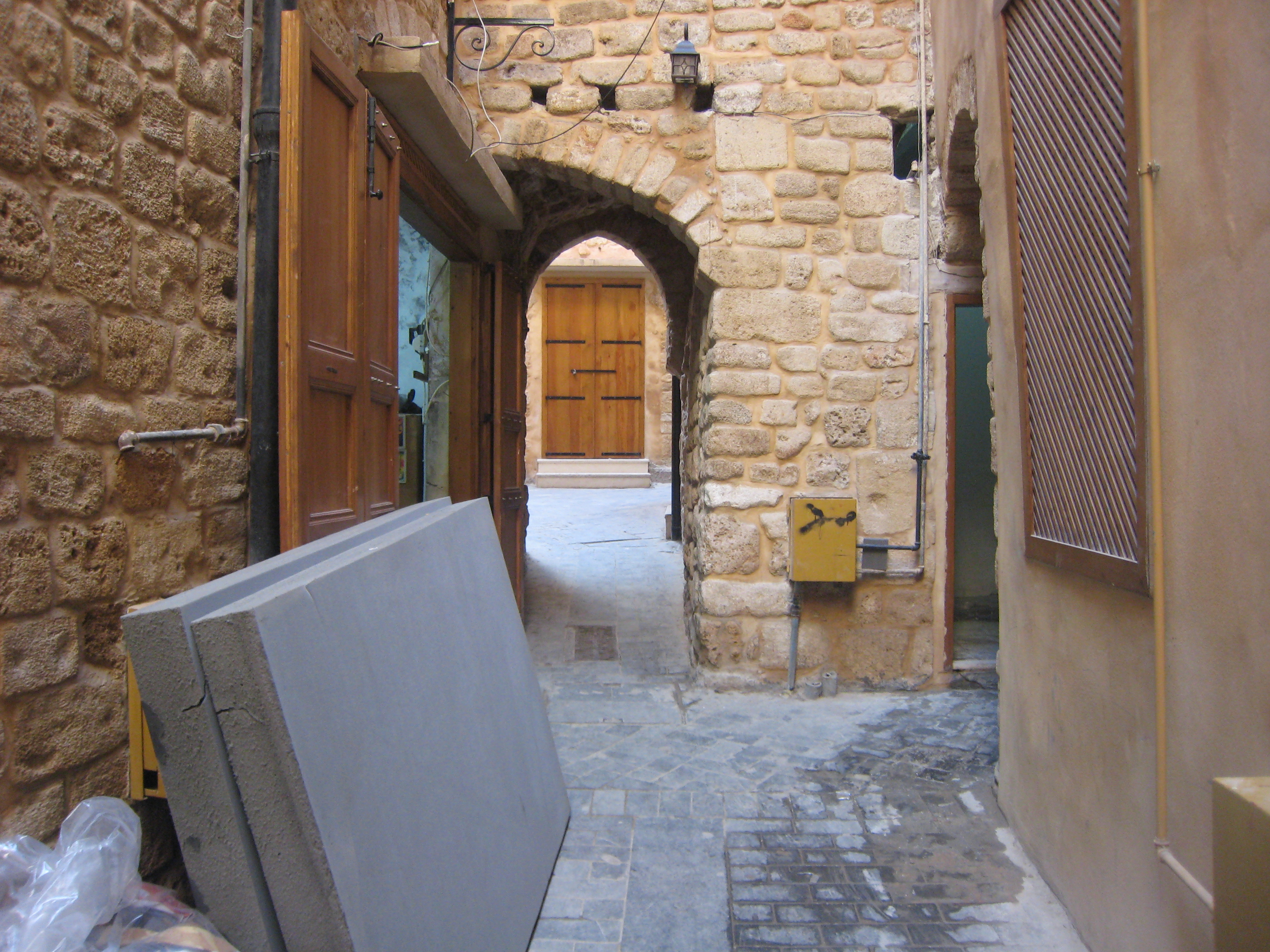
Rebuilding of the historical city centre of Sidon in Lebanon after the civil war.

Building restoration describes a particular treatment approach and philosophy within the field of architectural conservation and historic preservation. It emphasizes the preservation of structures such as historic sites, houses, monuments, and other significant properties through careful maintenance and upkeep. Restoration aims to create accurate depictions of these locations and protect them against deterioration that could make them inaccessible or unrecognizable in the future.

=== Overview ===
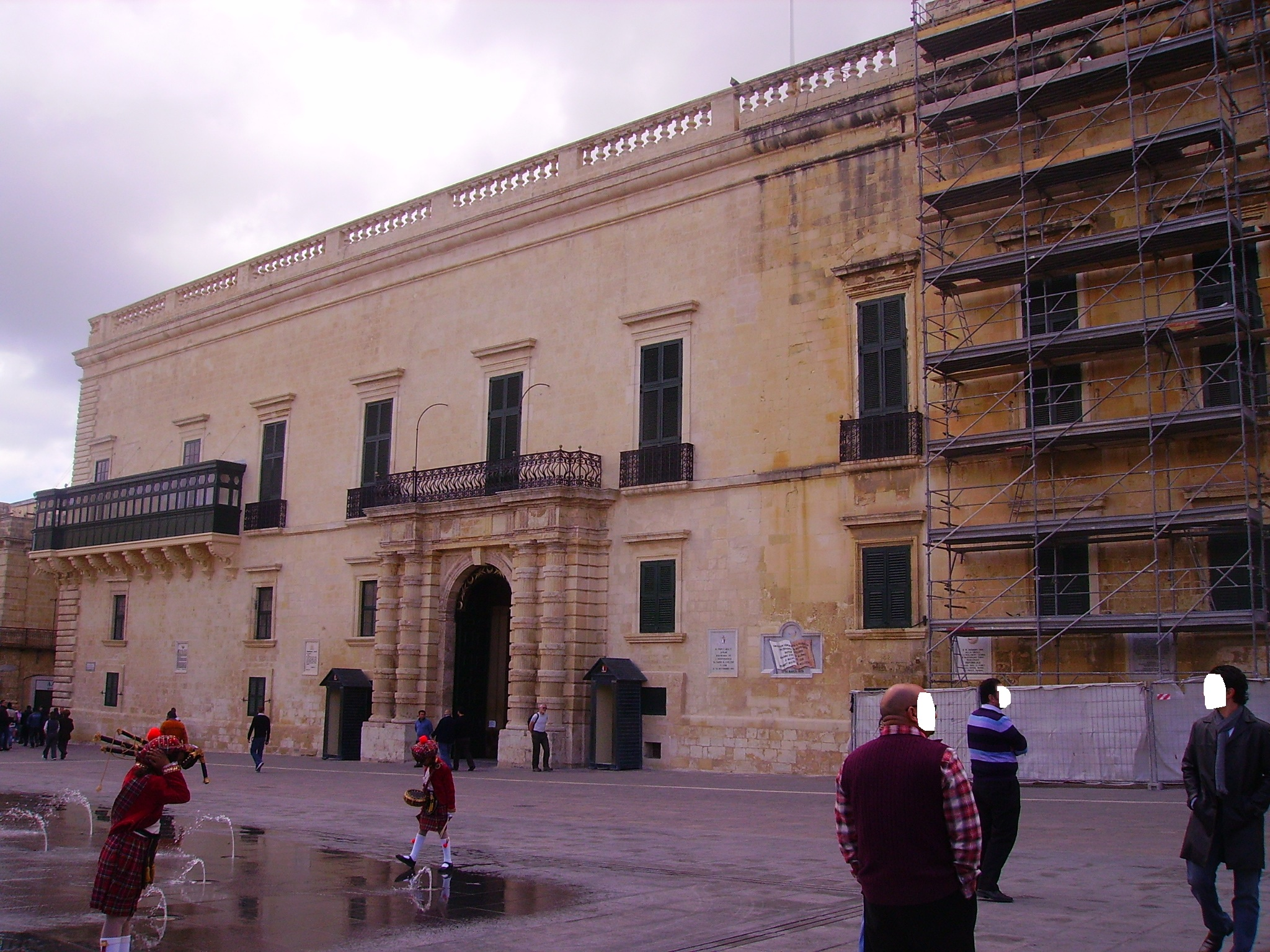
The Grandmaster's Palace in Valletta, Malta being restored in 2011.

In the field of historic preservation, building restoration is the action or process of accurately revealing, recovering or representing the state of a historic building, as it appeared at a particular period in its history, while protecting its heritage value. Restoration work may be performed to reverse decay, or alterations made to the buildings.

Historic building conservation is more about fostering an appreciation for these structures and learning more about why they exist, rather than just keeping historic structures standing tall and appearing robust. As a result, true historic building preservation aims for a high level of authenticity, accurately replicating historic materials and techniques as much as possible, ideally using modern techniques only in a concealed manner where they will not compromise the historic character of the structure's appearance.

For instance a restoration might involve the replacement of outdated heating and cooling systems with newer ones, or the installation of climate controls that never existed at the time of building after careful study. Tsarskoye Selo, the complex of former royal palaces outside St Petersburg in Russia is an example of this sort of work.

Exterior and interior paint colors present similar problems over time. Air pollution, acid rain, and sun take a toll, and often many layers of different paint exist. Historic paint analysis of old paint layers now allow a corresponding chemical recipe and color to be re-produced. But this is often only a beginning as many of the original materials are either unstable or in many cases environmentally unsound. Many eighteenth century greens were made with arsenic and lead, materials no longer allowed in paints. Another problem occurs when the original pigment came from a material no longer available. For example, in the early to mid-19th century, some browns were produced from bits of ground mummies. In cases like this the standards allow other materials with similar appearance to be used and organizations like Britain's National Trust for Places of Historic Interest or Natural Beauty will work with a historic paint color re-creator s to replicate the antique paints in durable, stable, and environmentally safe materials. In the United States the National Trust for Historic Preservation is a helpful resource. The polychrome painted interiors of the Vermont State House and Boston Public Library are examples of this type of heritage restoration.

=== Types of treatment ===
Historical conservation is the "preservation and repair of archaeological, historical, and cultural sites and artifacts". When dealing with building conservation, there are four primary types of treatment, or ways in which a property can be managed. Each one has their own objectives and limitations.

- Preservation "places a high premium on the retention of all historic fabric through conservation, maintenance and repair". In other words, all the materials added to a building over its lifetime are retained and work is only completed when it is essential to prevent deterioration of the site.

The next two treatments are a subset of preservation with some variation to account for the different requirements of the building and the needs of the institution.

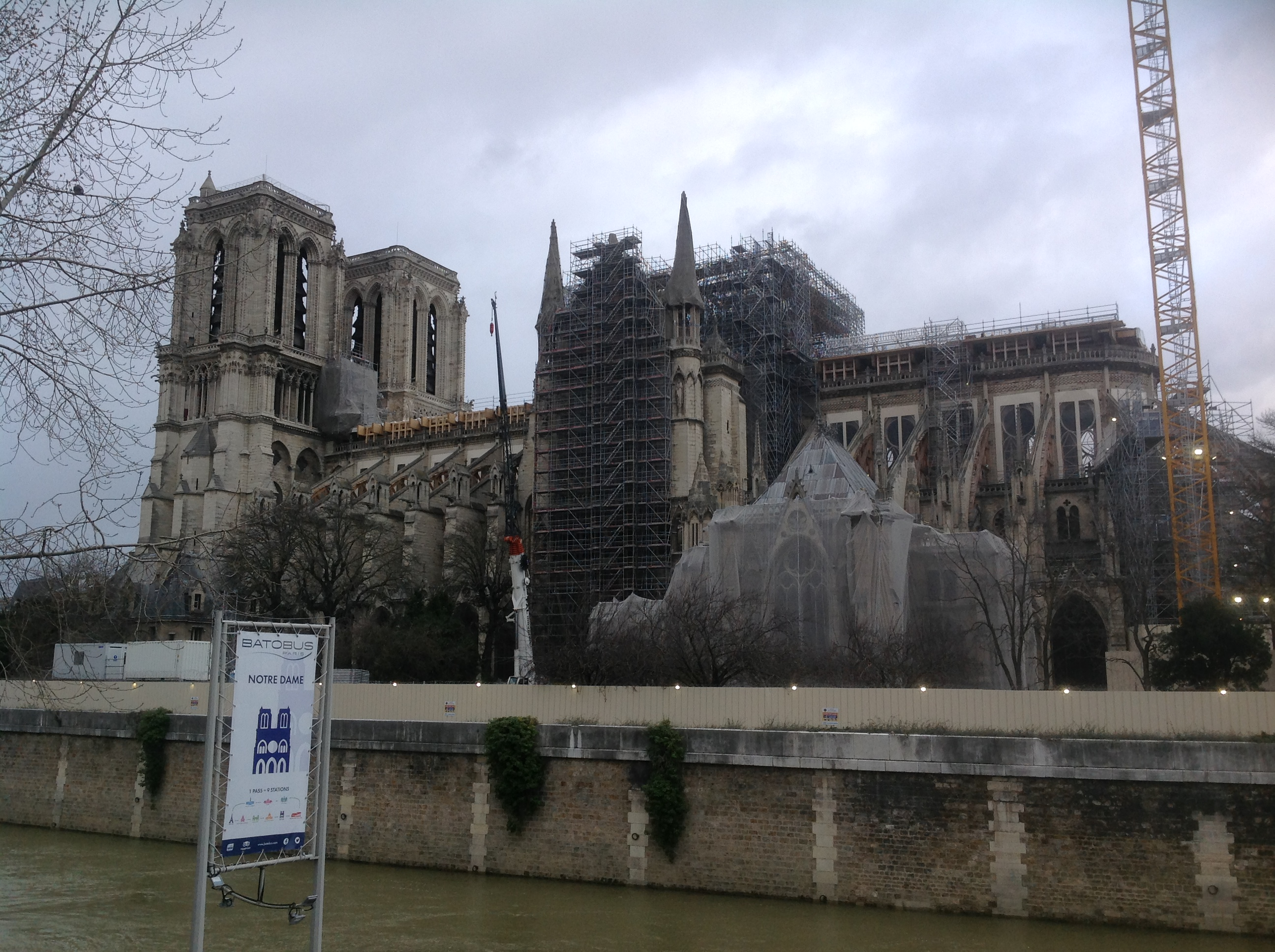
Renovation of Notre-Dame de Paris following the April 2019 fire.

- Rehabilitation is a more lenient standard of preservation because it assumes the building is so deteriorated that it needs repair to prevent further damage. It focuses on maintaining the materials, features, and spatial relationships that give a building historic character and allows for additions or alterations to be made that do not destroy the integrity of the property.

- Restoration like preservation, it works to maintain as much of the original material as possible. However, the focus of restoration is to present the property at a specific point in history. As result repairs and recreations of certain elements or fixtures are completed and anything which postdates the intended period is documented and removed. The extent of a restoration is limited by the existing structure or proof of pre-existing features that were previously modified. Designs that were never executed cannot be included.

- Reconstruction the most substantial type of treatment, it allows for the recreation of a former sites, landscape, or objects that no longer exists using all new materials. It is limited to aspects of a historic building that are essential for understanding and must be completed on documentary and physical evidence. Unlike the other treatments, a reconstruction must be labeled as a "contemporary re-creation" as it has historical foundations but is new in construction.

=== Reasonings for restoration ===
The reasons to restore a building most frequently fall into five main categories.

Value - Buildings hold intrinsic value not only in the history of the building, how it was used, but also how it was built. Historic buildings, notably pre-WWII, are built with higher quality materials and built under different standards than modern buildings.

Architectural design - Buildings have personalities, specific architectural elements that make the building unique and more valuable. Saving these unique traits within original building are ideal.

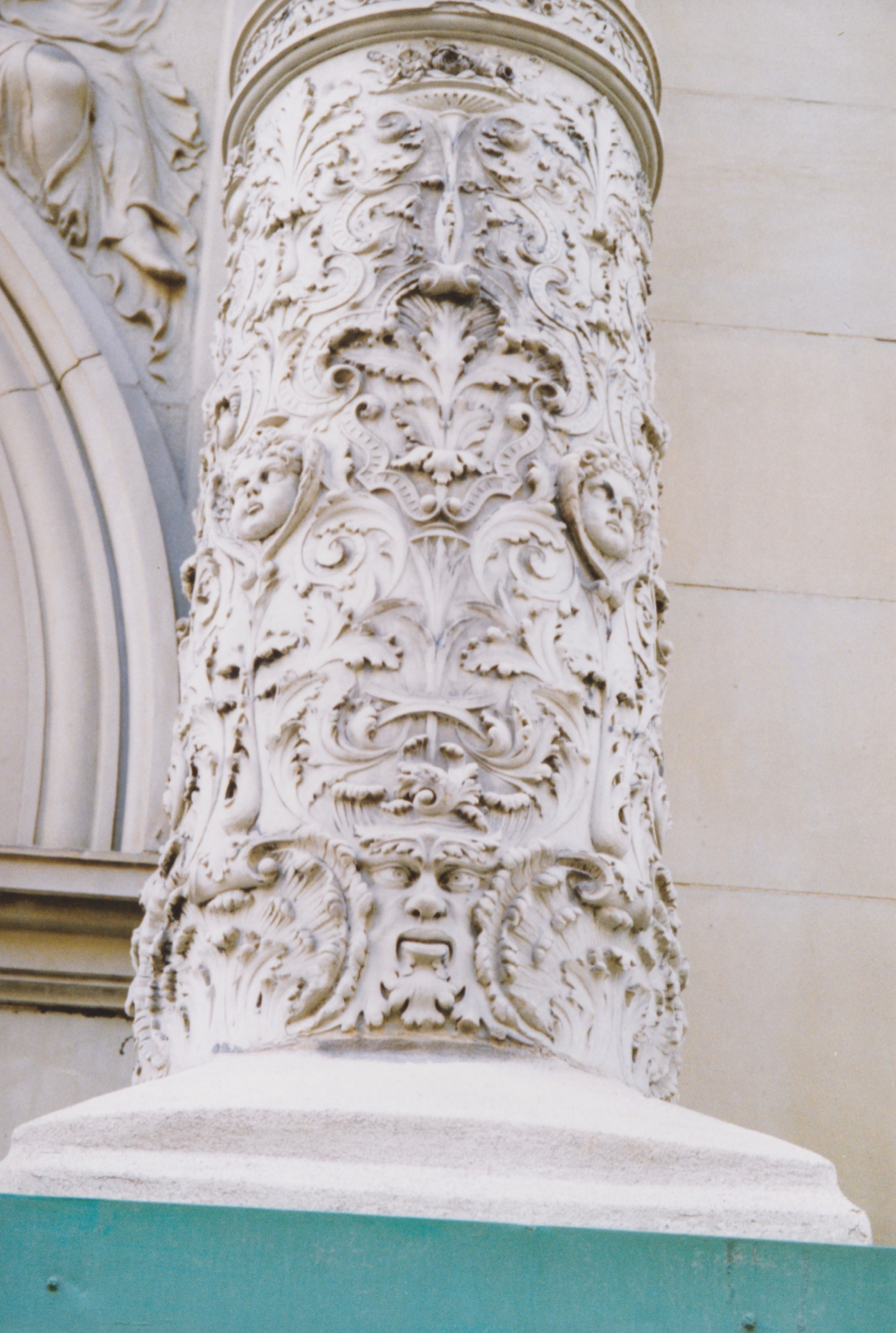
Decorative Pillar in Montreal, Quebec

Sustainability - Historic buildings store a lot of embodied energy. Hence, it is better to preserve or re-use them rather than demolition. Restoring a building for another purpose than its original intent is called adaptive reuse. Financially, businesses are better off restoring a building and adapting it for modern use than constructing a new site. The buildings are often built to better standards and as mentioned above have unique architectural elements that can increase business.

Cultural significance - One of the most important reasons that a site is restored is because of its cultural significance. Certain sites are tied to a nation’s identity making the site more valuable for what it provides to the culture than if it were demolished. According to Building Talk, “the renovation of heritage buildings is essential to the permanent residence of history and culture in the nation’s psyche.”

One chance rule - When a building is demolished what is lost cannot be measured. The site could hold a one of a kind design element or a historically significant past currently unknown. The One chance rule is guided by the idea that there is only one chance to restore a site and missing that opportunity could destroy a site of unknown significance.

Although rare, there are times when a site would be demolished or reconstruction is chosen over restoration. This decision is made primarily when the resources to restore the site are unavailable. The challenge to reconstruction is that there is an element of conjecture in the process that can easily alter the site unintentionally. Another reason not to restore a building is the value and knowledge that can be gained from the material remaining within the building. The Society for the Protection of Ancient Buildings has a unique approach to the preservation of historic buildings, which focuses on the materials that were used in the building's construction and what knowledge can be learned from the remaining material.

=== Standards of restoration ===
One of the biggest challenges to building restoration is that each country has their own terminology, standards, regulations and oversights which impact every restoration process. As a result, there are no international set of standards. Conservators often follow best practices in the restoration approach. Every restoration project will adhere to the standard that the property is to be used as it was originally intended. This standard will guide all other decisions in the restoration process. This would include which materials are selected, to methods of construction, and finishing touches to the building such as fixtures. The property being restored is considered a record of its time. Any work undertaken will only be to restore the site to the specified time period and no removal of those historical elements will be made, however this does not exclude removing elements not historically accurate to the site.

Best practices are as follows:

1. Analysis of the site should be the first step in the restoration process. Conservators will need to examine the site to determine its status and what changes have previously been made and what work will need to be done going forward including removals.
2. Extensive documentation must be conducted. This includes taking an inventory of all objects and fixtures within the building. Photographing the building inside and outside is mandatory. Every element and feature of the building must be photographed and documented in writing such as their location and function. While this may seem to be excessive, this is a crucial step in understanding the site and what work will need completed.
3. Before any work on the site is done, a conservator will develop a collection management policy for the restoration. This policy will include a statement of purpose, a plan for the restoration including a list of all proposed changes to the site, a list of the current collection of the site, accessioning policies for new additions, deaccessioning policies for collection items that will be removed during the process, guidelines for the care of collection during the restoration process, and a section of ethical guidelines to follow as the restoration moves forward. Additional sections can be added to the collection management policy depending on the building being restored, the items in the collection, and the historical significance of the site which could influence specific restoration requirements. One example of a collections management policy for restoration is the Edith Wharton Restoration, Inc. Collection Management Policy from The Mount, the historic home of Edith Wharton. The initial phase of restoration began in 1997, and has continually developed over the years. The Collection Management Policy above is from 2004.
4. All materials from the selected restoration period will be preserved for restoration. This includes materials, architectural features, design elements such as paint or wallpaper associated with the restoration period. Materials and architectural elements not specific to that period will be removed during restoration.
5. If a part of the building, fixtures, or design features are deteriorated, conservators must first attempt to repair the damage. If this is not possible, then a replacement is made. If replacement occurs, the new feature must match the original in color and design. Ideally, conservators will use materials associated with the time period, however this may not always be possible. If the changes of plasters and colored layers on the building are not documented and difficult to analyze, diagnostic methods such as stereomicroscopy, optical microscopy, fourier transform infrared (FTIR) spectroscopy, scanning electron microscopy with energy-dispersive X-ray spectroscopy (SEM-EDX) can be applied to identify the materials that were used before to provide information for better conservation and restoration solutions.
6. If a restoration requires an addition to the building, these changes must be proven through historical documentation and physical proof. Restoration avoids conjecture, and adding details that are not proven to have existed will only damage the value and significance of the site. If the building design did not exist in the period selected, it will not be included in the restoration.
7. Any treatments undertaken during restoration efforts will follow best practices for the material being treated. Treatments that will cause damage to the building or the historical materials within will not be used. Any treatment will affect the material, so conservators must carefully select the treatment method best for the material. For example, a brick facade will have a different treatment method from wrought iron.

Cultural heritage sites

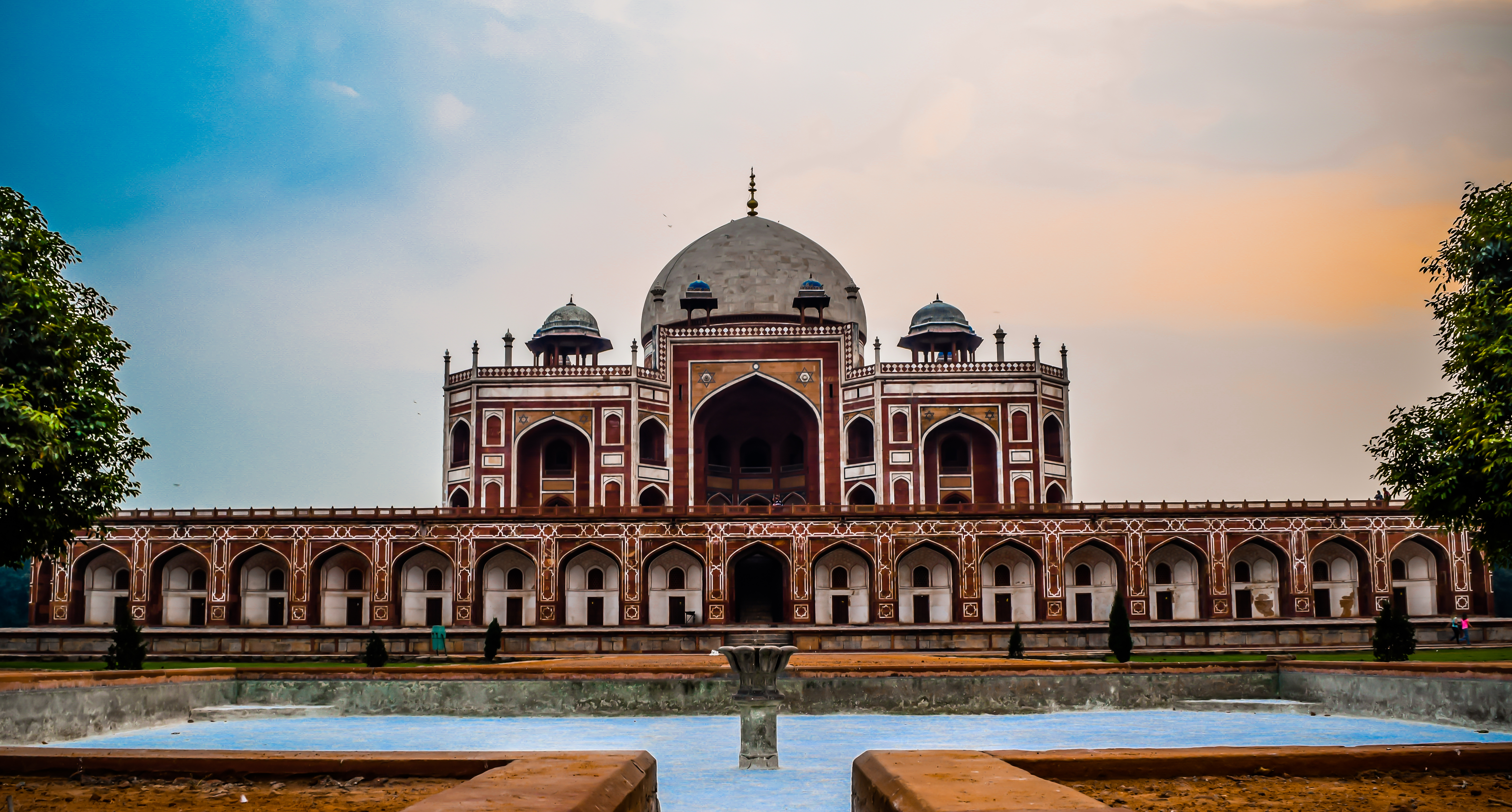
Humayun's Tomb, Delhi, India. The tomb was declared a UNESCO World Heritage Site in 1993, and since then has undergone extensive restoration work, which is complete.

Cultural Heritage is the physical and emotional reflection of a society, their legacy, and what they value. Tangible or physical representations include the material of the culture, locations of cultural significance, and the community associated with the culture. Intangible representations include oral stories, traditions, and the emotional connection to the cultural ancestors. The conservation and restoration of cultural heritage sites pose different challenges and often follow different guidelines because of designation of a heritage site. The United Nations Educational, Scientific and Cultural Organization (UNESCO) is a guiding resource in the conservation of cultural heritage sites. UNESCO's mission is to identify, protect, and preserve World Heritage Sites. The World Heritage List is constantly evolving as new sites of cultural significance are added. Another great resource for restoration of cultural heritage sites is the World Monuments Fund, which focuses on working with local groups around the world providing support for restoration, preservation, and stewardship.

Restoration of historic buildings

Restoration of historic buildings varies from country to country, just as with cultural heritage sites and other building restoration projects. Before any work is done on a historic building, conservator-restorers should consult local requirements. Best practices listed above still apply. One example of restoration of historic buildings is the work conducted by the National Park Service which owns and maintains thousands of historic buildings and has been a leader in historic preservation for over 100 years. The standards were developed in 1975 and updated in 1992. The standards deal with the "...materials, features, finishes, spaces, and spatial relationships..." of historic buildings and are divided into preservation, rehabilitating, restoration and reconstruction.

== Agents of deterioration ==
As buildings can sustain various forms of damage and deterioration over time, understanding the cause of this damage and finding the best way to treat and prevent it is an important aspect to building restoration. The Agents of Deterioration are the ten primary sources of damage to heritage objects and buildings comprised in a comprehensive list by the Canadian Conservation Institute. The Agents are physical forces, fire, pests, light (ultraviolet and infrared), incorrect relative humidity, thieves and vandals, water, pollutants, incorrect temperature and the dissociation of objects. While each of the ten agents can affect a historic building, some agents cause more common types of damage that may be addressed through building restoration.

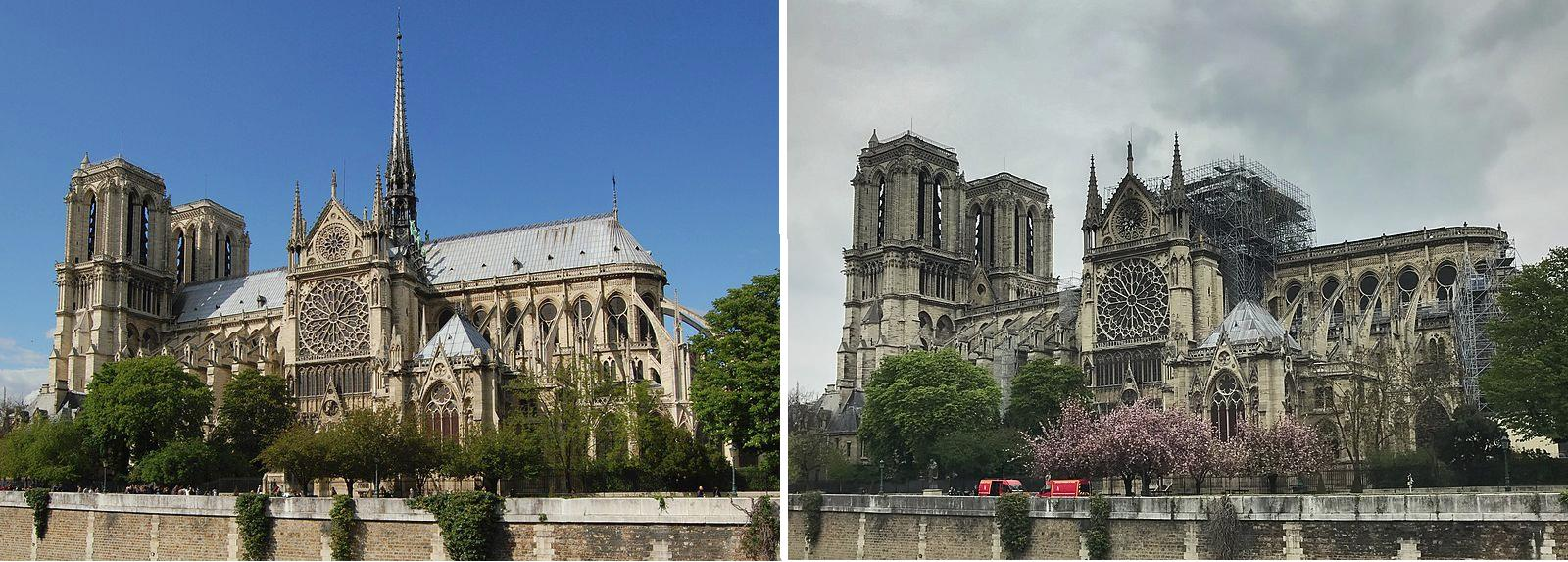
Notre-Dame de Paris before and after the 2019 fire, with early signs of restoration following significant fire damage

- Fire damage can be a significant threat to historic buildings as many of the original components of these buildings may be made of wood or other flammable substances. Damage can result from internal fires such as electrical faults, external fires including forest fires and damage due to lightning strikes. Fire damage can also increase the likelihood of water damage due to exposure to the elements, sprinkler systems and water used by safety personnel to put out the fire. Building restoration needed for this time of damage can include replacing wooden beams and structural elements as soon as possible to ensure that the building does not collapse, removing burnt flooring and plaster, and following a detailed plan of action to make sure that elements of the building are not lost during the restoration process. Creating positive connections with local fire service personnel and establishing a fire safety plan can help to prevent or minimize future fire-related situations. An example of fire damage and restoration is the Notre-Dame de Paris fire that occurred on 15 April 2019. The fire caused significant damage to the roof and wooden structures including the destruction of the cathedral’s spire. The cause of the fire is still under investigation but may be due to an electrical shortage. Reconstruction and restoration plans were approved on 16 July by the French parliament to recreate damaged structures in a way that preserves the historical and architectural integrity of their original construction.
- Water damage, both interior and exterior, can cause significant damage to the structural integrity of a historic building and can create numerous types of damage that may need to be addressed during restoration. This can include burst pipes or flooding resulting in the peeling of paint from internal walls, the running of dyes from textiles and general staining. Water damage also includes mold growth and internal deterioration due to incorrect humidity levels or a lack of humidity control within the building. It is recommended that wood, textiles and other absorbent materials that have sustained extensive water damage and cannot be dried and cleaned be removed and replaced, as they may continue to foster mold growth. For historic buildings in areas that are prone to persistent flooding, the building can be raised or moved to a higher location. To mitigate general water control, an inspection checklist can be created for staff to inspect noticeable pipes, make note of any leaks within the building during storms as well as ensuring exterior elements of the historic building are adequately removing water such as drains and gutters. Internal humidity control devices can also mitigate mold and damage stemming from moisture. An example of water damage and building restoration is the extensive flooding of St. Mark’s Basilica in Venice, Italy. While rising flood waters have been an increasing concern, a large flood on 12 November 2019 caused significant damage to the building, including damage to marble flooring, the deterioration of mosaics and mortar from salt in the water, and flooding of the crypt. Building restoration and prevention efforts include removing salt, checking for cracks in the flooring that may allow water to seep in and adding water pumps in the back of the building. An emergency fund of €1m was implemented by the local government to aid in these efforts and further discussions of flood protection for the city are ongoing.

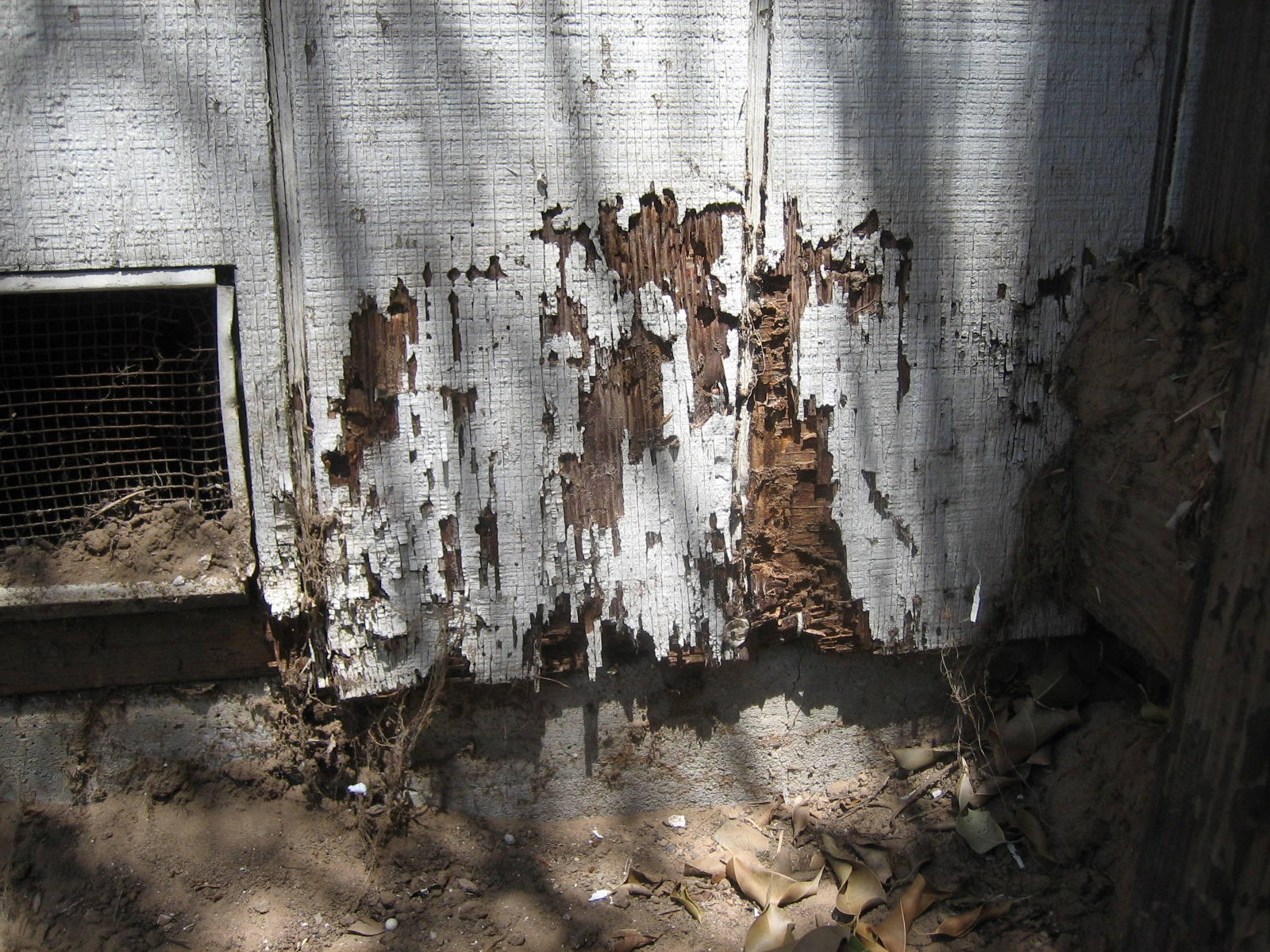
An example of building damage created by termites

- Pest control and awareness can prevent a variety of damage to historic buildings as well as preventing further damage in the future. Pests can include a variety of things from termites (termite, (order Isoptera), any of a group of cellulose-eating insects) and feed on wood or other dead plant matter) who can feast on the wooden structural elements of a historic building to rodents who may gnaw on or burrow into the building and objects within the building. Damage created by large pest infestations such as termites can be irreversible, with building restoration taking the form of replacement in order to maintain a sound structure for the building. The most effective way to mitigate pest damage is to implement proactive measures prior to a pest infestation that may cause irreparable damage. These measures can include blocking off exterior openings, placing and checking traps for signs of pests and involving a pest management professional to check the building regularly. An example of pest damage and control involving building restoration is the approach taken by Colonial Williamsburg. With over 600 historic buildings with wooden elements, Colonial Williamsburg has seen termite damage and has since created an extensive action plan in order prevent and detect termite activity. These measures include routine inspections, training staff in termite detection and performing restoration where needed.
- Physical forces can impact a historic building in various ways both internally and externally. Powerful storms and winds can cause external damage to the building while internal forces such as strong impacts can cause cracks to walls or damage objects held within the building. Physical forces also include shocks and vibrations that can damage the fragile structure of the building, such as vibrations stemming from construction or large events. Building restoration and damage prevention can include training staff on proper object handling within the space, performing evaluations on structural integrity and measuring the levels of vibration that are deemed safe in and around the building. Understanding the structural health of the building, including vibration measuring, can help in determining restoration work that is safe to perform. An example of physical forces that will require building restoration is damage to the historic Mechanics Hall building in Worcester, Massachusetts. Strong winds during a storm on 13 April 2020 caused portions of the copper roofing to be pulled from the building, allowing further damage to the attic and internal water damage. With the cancellation of spring events due to COVID-19, restoration plans such as restoring the copper roof and fully repairing internal areas from water damage are pending. Recent research has found that self-healing coatings can be applied to rock and stone to repair cracks as they begin to appear; this technique has already been successfully applied at Tintern Abbey in Wales.

== See also ==
- Conservation-restoration
- Athens Charter
- Venice Charter
- Florence Charter
- Barcelona Charter
- Historic preservation
- International Union of Bricklayers and Allied Craftworkers
- Traditional trades
- Conservation-restoration of cultural heritage
- Category:Restored and conserved buildings
- Conservation and restoration of historic gardens
- Docomomo International
- English Heritage
- Heritage organizations
- Historic preservation
- Sustainable heritage
- Materials science
- National Register of Historic Places
- National Trust (disambiguation), with a listing of National Trusts worldwide
- The Georgian Group
- World Heritage Sites
- World Monuments Fund

== Related journals ==
- Context The official journal of the IHBC
- International Journal of Architectural Heritage
- Journal of the American Institute for Conservation
- Journal of Architectural Conservation
- Western Association for Art Conservation
- Journal of the Society of Architectural Historians'
