= Trustor =

Trustor may refer to:

- Trustor (trust law), a person who settles property on express trust for the benefit of beneficiaries
- Trustor (agent), an entity that trusts another entity

== See also ==
- Trustor affair, an investment company takeover
- Trust (disambiguation)
- Trustee (disambiguation)
