= List of speakers of the House of Assembly of Eswatini =

The Speaker is elected by the House, either among its own members (other than ministers) or from among persons who are not members. This is an incomplete list of speakers of the House of Assembly of Eswatini before and after Swaziland was renamed to Eswatini. The below is a list of speakers of the House of Assembly of Eswatini:

Name	Entered office	Left office	Notes
Msindazwe Sukati	1967	September 1968	
Ian Banwell Aers, OBE	September 1968	1973	
In abeyance	1973	1980	
Jethro M. Mamba	1980	1984	
Seth Z. S. Dlamini	1984	1994	
Musa Sibandze	1994	1998	
Mgabhi Dlamini	1998	February 2000	
Mntonzima Dlamini	March 2000	July 2000	
Nicholas S'kakadza Matsebula	July 2000	May 2003–?	
Marwick Khumalo	February 2004	March 2004	
Trusty Gina (acting)	11 March 2004	12 May 2004	
Charles Magongo	12 May 2004	2006	
Trusty Gina (acting)	26 October 2006	3 November 2006	
Prince Guduza Dlamini	7 December 2006	October 2013	
Themba Msibi	21 October 2013	11 October 2018	
Petros Mavimbela	11 October 2018	6 October 2023	
Jabulani Mabuza	6 October 2023	Incumbent	
