= Guduza Dlamini =

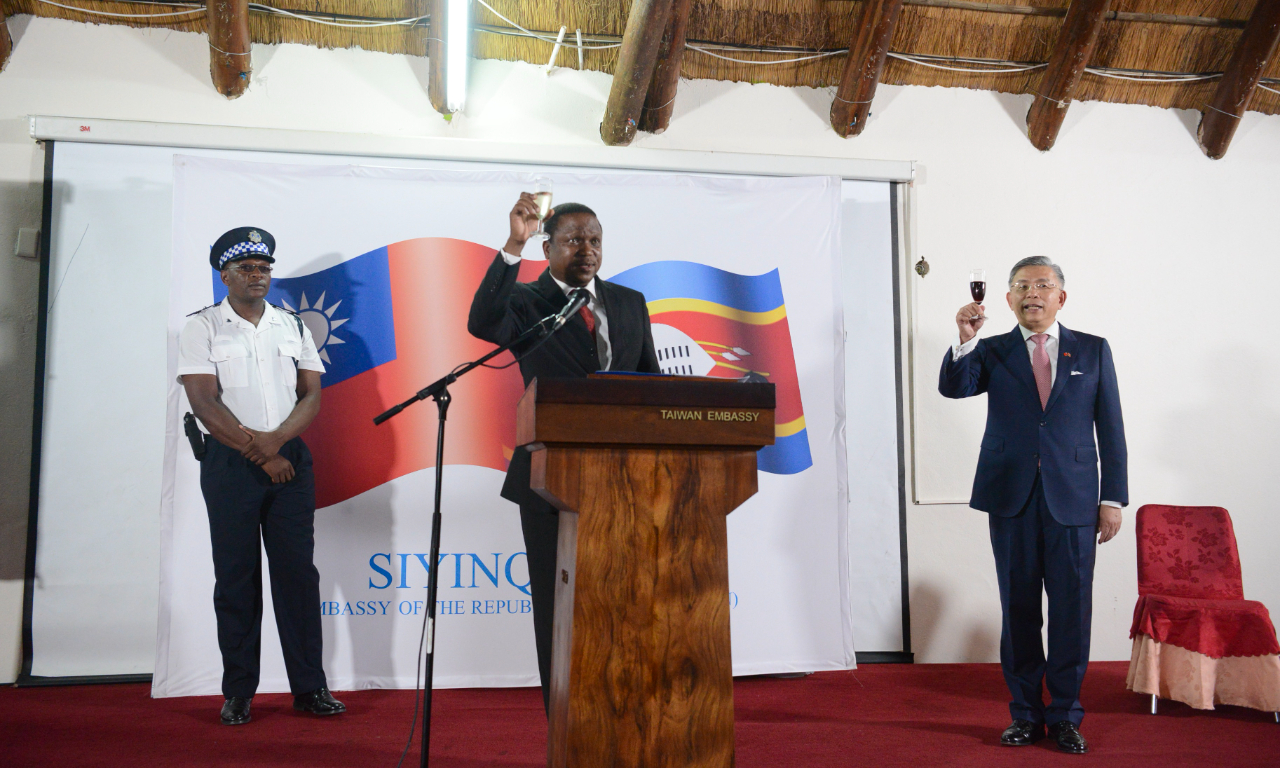
Prince Guduza at the Embassy of the Republic of China on the National Day of the ROC in 2022

Prince Guduza Dlamini is the Speaker of the House of Assembly of Swaziland from December 2006 to June 2013. He is a member of the House of Dlamini and the brother of Mswati III of Eswatini. He was a member of the Senate of Swaziland from 1993 to 2003. He held several ministerial portfolios during that time. These include minister of home affairs in 1998, minister of natural resources and energy from 1998 to 2001 and minister of economic planning and development from 2001 to 2003.
