= Elswyth Thane =

American romance novelist (1900–1984)

Helen 'Elswyth Thane' Ricker Beebe
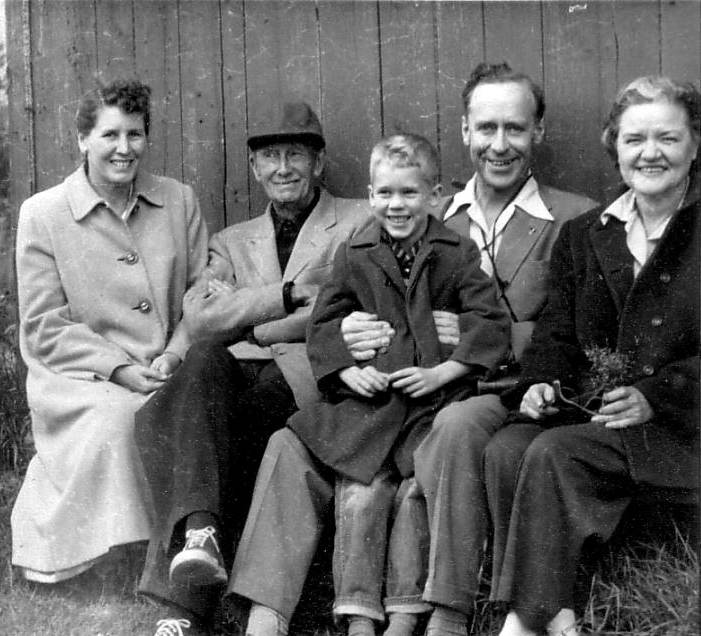
- Elswyth Thane (far right) and husband 'Will' Beebe (2nd from left) with friends at home near Wilmington, Vermont in 1957
- Occupations: Novelist; journalist; screenwriter
- Writing career
- Pen name: Elswyth Thane
- Period: 1926–1976
- Genres: historical fiction, romance

Helen Ricker Beebe (May 16, 1900 – July 31, 1984) was an American romance novelist who published under the name Elswyth Thane.

== Early life and writing career ==
Born in Burlington, Iowa, she was the daughter of a local teacher and high school principal. The family moved to New York City in 1918, and "Helen Ricker" changed her name to "Elswyth Thane". She began working as a freelance writer in the 1920s, and became a newspaper writer and a Hollywood screenwriter. Her first novel, Riders of the Wind, was published in 1926. Her novel, The Tudor Wench, about Elizabeth I of England, was made into a play.

Thane is most famous for her "Williamsburg" series of historical fiction. The books cover several generations of two families from the American Revolutionary War up to World War II. In later books, the action moves from Williamsburg to New York City, Richmond, Virginia and England.

== Personal life ==
On September 22, 1927, at 27 years old she married 50-year-old naturalist and explorer William Beebe; it was his second marriage. Beebe died in 1962, leaving half of his estate to his widow. She lived on the couple's farm in Wilmington, Vermont. Her last work, Fighting Quaker: Nathaniel Greene, was published in 1972. When she died, she left her papers to the University of Iowa.

== Bibliography ==
=== Williamsburg series ===
- Dawn's Early Light (1943)
- Yankee Stranger (1944)
- Ever After (1945)
- The Light Heart (1947)
- Kissing Kin (1948)
- This Was Tomorrow (1951)
- Homing (1957)

=== Other works ===
- Riders of the Wind (1926)
- Echo Answers (1927)
- His Elizabeth (1928)
- Cloth of Gold (1929)
- Bound to Happen (1930)
- The Tudor Wench (1932)
- Young Mr. Disraeli (1936; play)
- Queen's Folly (1937)
- Tryst (1939)
- England Was an Island Once (1940)
- From This Day Forward (1941)
- Remember Today: Leaves from a Guardian Angel's Notebook (1941)
- The Bird Who Made Good (1947)
- Melody, a Romance (1950)
- Reluctant Farmer (1950) aka The Strength of the Hills (1976) (Note: Briefly reviewed in the February 4, 1950 issue of The New Yorker, p.95.)
- The Lost General (1953)
- Letter to a Stranger (1954)
- The Family Quarrel: A Journey through the Years of the Revolution (1959)
- Washington's Lady 1960)
- Potomac Squire (1963)
- Mount Vernon Is Ours: The Story of Its Preservation (1966)
- Mount Vernon: The Legacy: The Story of Its Preservation and Care since 1885 (1967)
- Mount Vernon Family (1968)
- The Virginia Colony (1969)
- Dolley Madison, Her Life and Times (1970)
- The Fighting Quaker: Nathanael Greene (1972)

———————

Bibliography notes
