= Ian Aers =

British civil servant

Ian Benwell J. Aers (14 January 1921 – 13 November 1995) was a British civil servant in the Foreign Office who emigrated to Swaziland and served as the Speaker of the House of Assembly.

Aers was born in 1921 in India. He attended Dulwich College, and was commissioned from Royal Military Academy Sandhurst. After his service in World War II (ranked major), he joined the Tanganyika Administrative Service, where he served from 1948 to 1963.

Aers was assigned to Swaziland in 1963. In 1964 he became clerk to the first Legislative Council of Swaziland, and in 1965 served as an acting speaker. In 1965 he was also appointed as the director of broadcasting of Swaziland Broadcasting Service. Aers continued in that post when he was elected Speaker of the House of Assembly in 1968. He continued as speaker until the legislature was abolished in 1973.

Aers was appointed Officer of the Order of the British Empire in 1970. He died in Norwich, England, on 13 November 1995, at the age of 74.
