= Debt rescheduling =

Form of debt modification

Debt rescheduling is the lengthening of the time of debt repayment by restructuring the terms of an existing loan.

== Types of resecheduling ==
In retail banking, the debt rescheduling can be applied for personal loans given to individuals as education loan, consumer credit, mortgage loan and loans given for making investment in financial assets such as equity shares, debenture, and bond (finance). In North America and Europe, there are the portals which offers loan rescheduling/restructuring/consolidation via peer-to-peer lending marketplace such as Prosper Marketplace and LendingClub.

=== Approaches; ===
- Reduce payment amounts by extending the payment period and increasing the number of payments.
- Pause payments by adding debt moratorium period in a loan term during which the borrower is not required to make any repayment but it increases the amount of the monthly instalments.

== See also ==
- Mortgage modification
- Loan modification company
- Debt relief
