= National Trust (disambiguation) =

The National Trust is a conservation organisation in England, Wales and Northern Ireland.

National Trust may also refer to:

- National trust, an organisation that engages in cultural and environmental preservation for a particular country

== National trust organizations ==
- National Trust of Australia
  - National Trust of Queensland
  - National Trust of Australia (Victoria)
- Bahamas National Trust
- National Trust of Guernsey
- National Trust for Jersey
- National Trust for Scotland
- National Trust for Historic Preservation in the United States
- National Trust for Ireland

== Politics ==
- National Trust Party (Iran)
- National Trust Party (Malaysia)

== Other uses ==
- National Trust Company, a former business in Canada
- The National Trust (band), a US musical project
- National Trust (typeface), the National Trust's corporate typeface
- National Trust for Local News, American nonprofit organization

== See also ==
- An Taisce, the National Trust for Ireland
- Trust (social sciences), as directed towards a nation or its government
- Trust (disambiguation)
- Trust company, a corporation organized to perform the fiduciary of trusts and agencies
