= Tryst (novel) =

1939 novel by Elswyth Thane

First edition (publ. Duel Sloane Pearce)

Tryst, written in 1939 by Elswyth Thane, is a story of two people fated to be together. While a quick summary may make it sound like a horror novel, it actually borders on mystery and romance.

Set against the background of a world on the brink of war and published before World War II began, the story takes a look at people who hold principles higher than their own lives, truths that might better have been kept secret, and throws light on the life of the upper class in the course of a seemingly light trifle of a romantic ghost story.

Author Elswyth Thane was well known for her historical novels about early America. This romance was written about the then-contemporary world and set in England. The book takes a look at a world about to disappear, then leaves it behind in a fantastic (in every sense) story.

== Plot summary ==
Sabrina Archer, a shy, retiring young woman moves to a gloomy looking house in the country with her father and aunt. The father is a professor completely wrapped up in himself and his work to the exclusion of the needs of anyone else, and sprang the move on his womenfolk without notice. The aunt has a yappy overweight dog, whose comfort she places higher than Sabrina's. Surprisingly, the house turns out to be sunny and has a wonderful garden, which the aunt enjoys working in. The house is full of books, which are our heroine's only friends.

The lease of the huge house comes with a housekeeper of the owners. She is an uncanny woman.

Sabrina is drawn to a locked room, which belongs to Hilary, the younger son of the owners. She gets in, imagining its resident as a friend.

Hilary Shenstone works for the Home Office outside England in various clandestine roles. On a mission in India, he is shot, his last fervent thought to return to England. Which his spirit does, much to his surprise.

Hilary returns to his home, to find it rented out to strangers. His spirit is drawn to the daughter, as she becomes closer to him. Sabrina's aunt, alarmed by a ghost in the house and the fascination of our heroine with the dead man's room, decides she must remove the girl from the house.
