= Trusteeship (disambiguation) =

Trusteeship is a legal term which, in its broadest sense, is a synonym for anyone in a position of trust.

Trusteeship may also refer to:

- Trust law, a three-party fiduciary relationship
- Trusteeship (Gandhism), a socio-economic philosophy
- United Nations Trusteeship, Chapter XII of the United Nations Charter
- United Nations Trusteeship Council, one of the six principal organs of the United Nations

== See also ==
- Trustee (disambiguation)
