= Loan modification company =

A loan modification company, also known as a mortgage modification company, is a business that helps homeowners in the United States modify the terms of their home loans or mortgages. When a mortgage is modified, the original terms of the home loan contract between a lender and a borrower are renegotiated and then altered, usually in the favor of the borrower.

Many homeowners choose to obtain modifications to their home loans when they are struggling to pay their mortgages or hope to avoid foreclosure. In order to expedite the loan modification process, homeowners may rely upon the services of a local loan modification company. By working with company that handles loan modifications, homeowners "receive the advice, resources and services they need to obtain the best terms possible for their modification while avoiding scams, which are prevalent in the loan modification industry."

== Loan modification terms ==
Homeowners that successfully obtain loan modifications while working with a loan modification company may:

- reduce interest rates
- reduce principal
- reduce penalties and late fees
- increase the length of loan terms

Additionally, homeowners who are facing foreclosure may be able to remain in possession of their homes if they work with their lenders to modify their mortgage. Loan modification can also make homeowners’ monthly loan payments more affordable.

== Loan modification programs ==
Loan modification programs are offered by loan modification companies and can be helpful to homeowners who are struggling with making repayments on their mortgages. Many of these programs enable homeowners to pay zero advance fees, reduce monthly mortgage payments and stop foreclosure. Loan modification companies can also inform homeowners of federal programs, which may be advantageous.

In the United States there are numerous federal loan modification programs that homeowners can partake in, like the FDIC Loan Modification Program. However, homeowners must meet government mandated eligibility requirements before they can enroll. The program offered by the FDIC has two main goals:

1. Determining a payment the borrower can afford.
2. Protecting investors’ interests.

Another program is the Homeowner Affordability and Stability Plan (HASP). On February 18, 2009, President Barack Obama announced this $75 billion initiative, which has one aim, to make housing affordable for all U.S. residents. The HASP is a "comprehensive plan to help responsible homeowners avoid foreclosure by providing affordable and sustainable mortgage loans."

As part of the HASP, there are 3 distinct programs depending on borrower needs:

- Home Affordable Modification Program: HAMP
- Home Affordable Refinance Program: HARP
- Home Affordable Foreclosure Alternatives: HAFA

== Loan modification software companies ==
Loan modification software companies have been developed in order to be able to handle the demand for proper analysis. Loan modification software companies have been developed both for existing loan modification companies and also as a do it yourself model.

- Loan Modification Company Software: Software built for existing companies to help process paperwork and do analysis. These range from customer relationship management (CRMs), to online portals and also internal analysis.
