= Trustee System =

Trustee System may refer to:

- United Nations trust territories, the successors of the remaining League of Nations mandates
- Trustee system (Catholic Church), practices and institutions within certain parishes
