= Trusty Gina =

Eswatini politician

Trusty Gina is an Eswatini politician. She was Deputy Deputy Speaker of the House of Assembly of Swaziland from 2003-2008 and the acting Speaker from March 11 to May 11, 2004 and again from October 26 to November 3, 2006.
