= Petros Mavimbela =

Eswatini politician

Petros Mavimbela (born 1963) is a politician from Eswatini who is serving as Speaker of the House of Assembly from October 2018 and Eswatini Branch President of Commonwealth Parliamentary Association.
