= Trust Company =

A trust company is a company that specializes in the creation and administration of legal arrangements known as trusts.

It can also refer to:

- Trust Company (band)
- Trust Company, predecessor to SunTrust Banks
- Trust (company), Dutch manufacturer of computer and lifestyle peripherals

== See also ==
- Trust (business)
