= Trustor (agent) =

In social sciences and in information technology, trustor (also known as the truster in some contexts) is an entity that places trusts for another entity, known as the trustee. A Trustor may be a social agent -such as a person or an institution- or a technical agent, such as a computer or a software application, acting on behalf of a social agent.
