= Trist =

Trist may refer to:

- Browse Trist (1698?–1777), English MP
- David Trist (1947–2025), New Zealand cricketer
- Eric Trist (1909–1993), British scientist
- Margaret Trist (1914–1986), Australian short story writer and novelist
- Nicholas Trist (1800–1874), American diplomat
- Sidney Trist (1865–1918), English activist, journalist and editor
