= Giancarlo Corsetti =

Italian economist

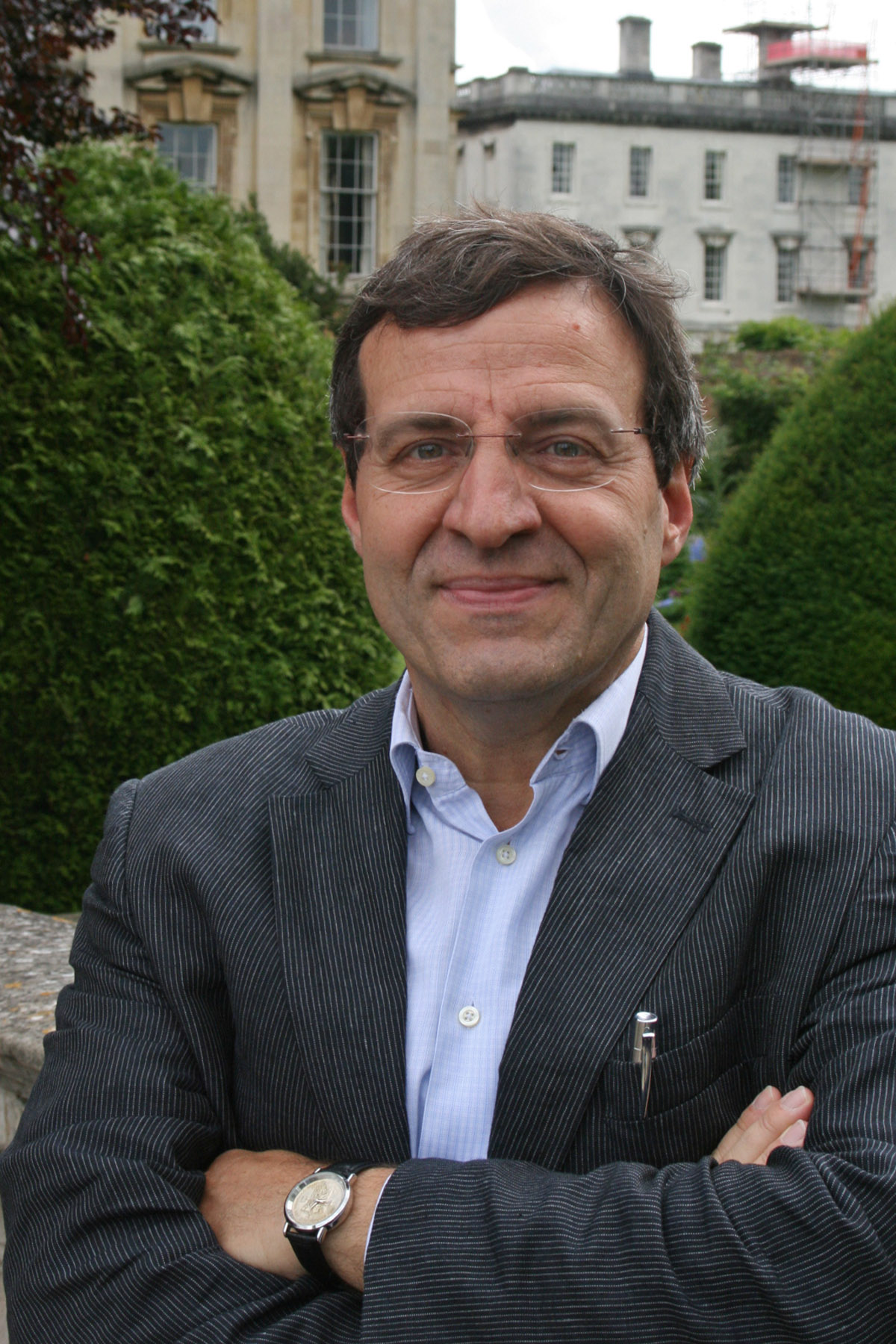
Giancarlo Corsetti, 2015

Giancarlo Corsetti, FBA (born 1960) is an Italian macroeconomist and Professor of Macroeconomics at the European University Institute in Florence. He is best known in academia for his work on open economy macroeconomics and international economics. In March 2017, the IDEAS/RePEc overall ranking put him as the most influential economist at Cambridge University where he was teaching at the time.

Corsetti has previously taught at Cambridge University where he was fellow of Clare College and the director of the Cambridge Institute for New Economic Thinking. Prior to this, he held the Pierre Werner Chair at the European University Institute in Florence, and held positions at the Universities Rome III, Bologna and Yale. He is co-editor of the Journal of International Economics and a research fellow at the Centre for Economic Policy Research, where he served as co-director of the International Macroeconomics Programme between 2004 and 2015. He is a consultant to the European Central Bank and visiting scholar at the Bank of England.

Corsetti is a member of the European Economic Association, where he served in the Council, and as Programme Chairman of the 2007 Annual Congress in Budapest. In 2015, he delivered the Schumpeter Lecture at the Association Meeting in Mannheim.

== Life and education ==
Giancarlo Corsetti earned a Ph.D. in economics at Yale University (1992), an MA in Economics at New York University (1987) and a Laurea in Economics at Sapienza University of Rome (1984).

== Contributions ==
His work includes analyses of the Maastricht Treaty, studies of the European Currency Crises in 1992-93 and the Asian Crisis in the late Nineties, contributions to New Open Economy Macroeconomics, theoretical and empirical work on financial contagion and currency instability, models of exchange rate pass-through and imported inflation, as well as pioneering analyses of the propagation and stabilization of international business cycles with imperfect capital markets and current account imbalances. His recent work on fiscal policy combines micro- and macroeconomic analysis. His contribution on the government spending multiplier based on a quasi-experiment in Italy involving Mafia infiltration of local municipalities has been discussed in the media.

Corsetti has contributed to the academic discussion on European integration, with theory-informed analyses of fiscal rules, financial and macroeconomic instability and stabilization policy in incomplete monetary unions. At Yale, he created the Euro Homepage which, between 1998 and 2001, became a reference in the policy and academic discussion around the launch of the new currency. Between 2000 and 2010, he co-authored the Annual Report of the European Economic Advisory Group at Cesifo. Since 2014 he is part of the CEPR group writing the "Monitoring the Eurozone" reports.

He has written two textbook chapters on optimal policies in open economy that are widely circulated, one on Master's level, the other among Ph.D. level students.

== Selected bibliography ==
- "Maastrict's Fiscal Rules" with Willem Buiter and Nouriel Roubini, Economic Policy, 1993, 57-100.
- "Interpreting the ERM Crisis: Country-Specific and Systemic Issues" with Willem Buiter and Paolo Pesenti, Princeton Studies in International Finance, No. 84, February 1998.
- Financial Markets and European Monetary Cooperation. The lessons from the 92-93 crisis, with Willem Buiter and Paolo Pesenti, 1998, Cambridge University Press.
- "What Caused the Asian Currency and Financial Crisis?", with Nouriel Roubini, Japan and the World Economy, September 1999.
- "Welfare and macroeconomic interdependence" with Paolo Pesenti, Quarterly Journal of Economics, May 2001.
- "International Dimensions of Optimal Monetary Policy" with Paolo Pesenti, Journal of Monetary Economics, 2005, 281-305.
- "Does one Soros make a difference? A theory of currency crisis with large and small traders" with Amil Dasgupta, Stephen Morris and Hyun Son Shin, Review of Economic Studies, January 2004, 71(1): 87-113.
- "Some contagion, some interdependence. More pitfalls in tests of financial contagion" with Massimo Sbracia and Marcello Pericoli, Journal of International Money and Finance, 2005, 24:1177-1199.
- "Macroeconomics of International Price Discrimination" with Luca Dedola, Journal of International Economics, 2005, 67(1): 129-156.
- "The simple geometry of transmission and stabilization in closed and open economy", with Paolo Pesenti, in Lucrezia Reichlin and Kennet West (eds.), NBER International Seminar on Macroeconomics, 2007.
- "International Risk Sharing and the International Transmission of Productivity Shocks" with Luca Dedola and Silvain Leduc, Review of Economic Studies, 2008, 75(2): 443-473.
- "Optimal Monetary Policy in Open Economy", with Luca Dedola and Silvain Leduc, in Ben Friedman and Michael Woodford (eds.), The Handbook of Monetary Economics, vol. III, 2010.
- "What Drives US Foreign Borrowing? Evidence on External Adjustment to Transitory and Permanent Shocks" with Panagiotis Konstantinou, American Economic Review, April 2012, 102(2): 1062-92.
- "Mafia and Public Spending: Evidence on the Fiscal Multiplier from a Quasi-experiment" with Antonio Acconcia and Saverio Simonelli, American Economic Review, July 2014, 104(7): 2185-2209.
