= Temporary Liquidity Guarantee Program =

FDIC program enacted in aftermath of the 2008 financial crisis

The Temporary Liquidity Guarantee Program (TLGP) was a program administered by the Federal Deposit Insurance Corporation (FDIC) from 2008 to 2012 in the aftermath of the 2008 financial crisis. The program sought to promote confidence in the US banking system by guaranteeing interbank loans and no-interest transaction accounts, such as checking accounts. It was announced through an Interim Rule on October 14, 2008.

== Components ==
The Temporary Liquidity Guarantee Program had two primary components: the Debt Guarantee Program, by which the FDIC guaranteed the payment of certain newly issued senior unsecured debt, and the Transaction Account Guarantee Program, by which the FDIC guaranteed certain noninterest-bearing transaction accounts. FDIC insured entities could opt out of either program.

=== Debt Guarantee Program ===
The Debt Guarantee Program guaranteed all newly issued senior unsecured debt up to prescribed limits issued by participating entities. As a result of this guarantee, the unpaid principal and contract interest of an entity’s newly issued senior unsecured debt were to be paid by the FDIC if the issuing insured depository institution failed or if a bankruptcy petition were filed by the respective issuing holding company. More than 6000 banks opted out of the program.DGP Opt-out list (.xls)

The Debt Guarantee Program passed out debt guarantees in excess of $600 billion. Yet, unlike the other major agencies bailing out the financial sector during the 2008 financial crisis—the Federal Reserve and the U.S. Treasury—the FDIC has never disclosed the identity of all the banks taking advantage of the bailout guarantees. Wilson and Wu (2011) find that the recipients of the FDIC debt guarantees paid their CEOs significantly more than their peers. Thus, bailed out CEOs made significantly more than bank CEOs not accepting the FDIC's bailout loan guarantees.

The Debt Guarantee Program stopped guaranteeing outstanding loans at the end of 2012.

=== Transaction Account Guarantee Program ===
The Transaction Account Guarantee Program provided for a temporary full guarantee by the FDIC for funds held at FDIC-insured depository institutions in noninterest-bearing transaction accounts above the existing deposit insurance limit. This would continue through the end of 2010. Thereafter section 343 of the Dodd-Frank Wall Street Reform and Consumer Protection Act provided similar transaction account insurance until the end of 2012.
