= Low-Income Countries Under Stress =

World Bank program aimed at poverty reduction in developing countries

Low-Income Countries Under Stress (LICUS) is a World Bank program aimed at poverty reduction in developing countries.
