= Japan and the World Economy =

- Discipline: Economics
- Language: English
- Edited by: Shin-Ichi Fukuda

Publication details
- History: 1988—present
- Publisher: Elsevier
- Frequency: Quarterly
- Impact factor: 0.339 (2011)

Standard abbreviations
- ISO 4: Jpn. World Econ.

Indexing
- ISSN: 0922-1425
- LCCN: 89659152
- OCLC no.: 38911042

Links
- Journal homepage; Online access

Japan and the World Economy is a peer-reviewed academic journal that was established in 1988 and is edited by Shin-Ichi Fukuda. It contains articles about Japanese economy, including finance, managerial sciences, agriculture, and economic ties with other countries.
