= Subprime mortgage crisis solutions debate =

The Subprime mortgage crisis solutions debate discusses various actions and proposals by economists, government officials, journalists, and business leaders to address the subprime mortgage crisis and broader 2008 financial crisis.

== Overview ==
The debate concerns both immediate responses to the ongoing subprime mortgage crisis, as well as long-term reforms to the global financial system. During 2008–2009, solutions focused on support for ailing financial institutions and economies. During 2010, debate continued regarding the nature of reform. Key points include: the split-up of large banks; whether depository banks and investment banks should be separated; whether banks should be able to make risky trades on their own accounts; how to wind-down large investment banks and other non-depository financial institutions without taxpayer impact; the extent of financial cushions that each institution should maintain (leverage restrictions); the creation of a consumer protection agency for financial products; and how to regulate derivatives.

Critics have argued that governments treated this crisis as one of investor confidence rather than deeply indebted institutions unable to lend, delaying the appropriate remedies. Others have argued that this crisis represents a reset of economic activity, rather than a recession or cyclical downturn.

In September 2008, major instability in world financial markets increased awareness and attention to the crisis. Various agencies and regulators, as well as political officials, began to take additional, more comprehensive steps to handle the crisis. To date, various government agencies have committed or spent trillions of dollars in loans, asset purchases, guarantees, and direct spending. For a summary of U.S. government financial commitments and investments related to the crisis, see CNN – Bailout Scorecard.

In the U.S. during late 2008 and early 2009, President Bush's $700 billion Troubled Asset Relief Program (TARP) was used to re-capitalize ailing banks through the investment of taxpayer funds. The U.S. response in 2009, orchestrated by U.S. Treasury Secretary Timothy Geithner and supported by President Barack Obama, focused on obtaining private sector money to recapitalize the banks, as opposed to bank nationalization or further taxpayer-funded capital injections. In an April 2010 interview, Geithner said: "The distinction in strategy that we adopted when we came in was to try and maximize the chance that capital needs could be met privately, not publicly." Geithner used "stress tests" or analysis of bank capital requirements to encourage private investors to re-capitalize the banks to the tune of $140 billion. Geithner has strenuously opposed actions that might interfere with private recapitalization, such as stringent pay caps, taxes on financial transactions, and the removal of key bank leaders. Geithner acknowledges this strategy is not popular with the public, which wants more draconian reforms and the punishment of bank leaders.

President Obama and key advisors introduced a series of longer-term regulatory proposals in June 2009. The proposals address consumer protection, executive pay, bank financial cushions or capital requirements, expanded regulation of the shadow banking system and derivatives, and enhanced authority for the Federal Reserve to safely wind-down systemically important institutions, among others.

Geithner testified before Congress on October 29, 2009. His testimony included five elements he stated as critical to effective reform:

1. Expand the Federal Deposit Insurance Corporation (FDIC) bank resolution mechanism to include non-bank financial institutions;
2. Ensure that a firm is allowed to fail in an orderly way and not be "rescued";
3. Ensure taxpayers are not on the hook for any losses, by applying losses to the firm's investors and creating a monetary pool funded by the largest financial institutions;
4. Apply appropriate checks and balances to the FDIC and Federal Reserve in this resolution process;
5. Require stronger capital and liquidity positions for financial firms and related regulatory authority.

The U.S. Senate passed a regulatory reform bill in May 2010, following the House, which passed a bill in December 2009. The New York Times has provided a comparative summary of the features of the two bills, which address to varying extent the principles enumerated by Secretary Geithner. The two bills were reconciled, and the Dodd–Frank Wall Street Reform and Consumer Protection Act was signed into law in July 2010.

Solutions may be organized in these categories:

1. Investor confidence or liquidity: Central banks have expanded their lending and money supplies, to offset the decline in lending by private institutions and investors.
2. Deeply indebted institutions or solvency: Some financial institutions are facing risks regarding their solvency, or ability to pay their obligations. Alternatives involve restructuring through bankruptcy, bondholder haircuts, or government bailouts (i.e., nationalization, receivership or asset purchases).
3. Economic stimulus: Governments have increased spending or cut taxes to offset declines in consumer spending and business investment.
4. Homeowner assistance: Banks are adjusting the terms of mortgage loans to avoid foreclosure, with the goal of maximizing cash payments. Governments are offering financial incentives for lenders to assist borrowers. Other alternatives include systematic refinancing of large numbers of mortgages and allowing mortgage debt to be "crammed down" (reduced) in homeowner bankruptcies.
5. Regulatory: New or reinstated rules designed help stabilize the financial system over the long-run to mitigate or prevent future crises.

== Liquidity ==
All major corporations, even highly profitable ones, borrow money to finance their operations. In theory, the lower interest rate paid to the lender is offset by the higher return obtained from the investments made using the borrowed funds. Corporations regularly borrow for a period of time and periodically "rollover" or pay back the borrowed amounts and obtain new loans in the credit markets, a generic term for places where investors can provide funds through financial institutions to these corporations. The term liquidity refers to this ability to borrow funds in the credit markets or pay immediate obligations with available cash. Prior to the crisis, many companies borrowed short-term in liquid markets to purchase long-term, illiquid assets like mortgage-backed securities (MBSs), profiting on the difference between lower short-term rates and higher long-term rates. Some have been unable to "rollover" this short-term debt due to disruptions in the credit markets, forcing them to sell long-term, illiquid assets at fire-sale prices and suffering huge losses.

The central bank of the USA, the Federal Reserve or Fed, in partnership with central banks around the world, has taken several steps to increase liquidity, essentially stepping in to provide short-term funding to various institutional borrowers through various programs such as the Term Asset-Backed Securities Loan Facility (TALF). Fed Chairman Ben Bernanke stated in early 2008: "Broadly, the Federal Reserve's response has followed two tracks: efforts to support market liquidity and functioning and the pursuit of our macroeconomic objectives through monetary policy." The Fed, a quasi-public institution, has a mandate to support liquidity as the "lender of last resort" but not solvency, which resides with government regulators and bankruptcy courts.

=== Lower interest rates ===
==== Arguments for lower interest rates ====
Lower interest rates stimulate the economy by making borrowing less expensive. The Fed lowered the target for the Federal funds rate from 5.25% to a target range of 0-0.25% since 18 September 2007. Central banks around the world have also lowered interest rates.

Lower interest rates may also help banks "earn their way out" of financial difficulties, because banks can borrow at very low interest rates from depositors and lend at higher rates for mortgages or credit cards. In other words, the "spread" between bank borrowing costs and revenues from lending increases. For example, a large U.S. bank reported in February 2009 that its average cost to borrow from depositors was 0.91%, with a net interest margin (spread) of 4.83%. Profits help banks build back equity or capital lost during the crisis.

==== Arguments against lower interest rates ====
Other things being equal, economic theory suggests that lowering interest rates relative to other countries weakens the domestic currency. This is because capital flows to nations with higher interest rates (after subtracting inflation and the political risk premium), causing the domestic currency to be sold in favor of foreign currencies, a variation of which is called the carry trade. Further, there is risk that the stimulus provided by lower interest rates can lead to demand-driven inflation once the economy is growing again. Maintaining interest rates at a low level also discourages saving, while encouraging spending.

=== Monetary policy and "credit easing" ===
Expanding the money supply is a means of encouraging banks to lend, thereby stimulating the economy. The Fed can expand the money supply by purchasing Treasury securities through a process called open market operations which provides cash to member banks for lending. The Fed can also provide loans against various types of collateral to enhance liquidity in markets, a process called credit easing. This is also called "expanding the Fed's balance sheet" as additional assets and liabilities represented by these loans appear there. A helpful overview of credit easing is available at: Cleveland Federal Reserve Bank-Credit Easing

The Fed has been active in its role as "lender of last resort" to offset declines in lending by both depository banks and the shadow banking system. The Fed has implemented a variety of programs to expand the types of collateral against which it is willing to lend. The programs have various names such as the Term auction facility and Term Asset-Backed Securities Loan Facility. A total of $1.6 (~$2.35 trillion in 2025) trillion in loans to banks were made for various types of collateral by November 2008. In March 2009, the Federal Open Market Committee (FOMC) decided to increase the size of the Federal Reserve’s balance sheet further by purchasing up to an additional $750 billion of agency (Government-sponsored enterprise) mortgage-backed securities, bringing its total purchases of these securities to up to $1.25 trillion this year, and to increase its purchases of agency debt this year by up to $100 billion to a total of up to $200 billion. Moreover, to help improve conditions in private credit markets, the Committee decided to purchase up to $300 billion (~$437 billion in 2025) of longer-term Treasury securities during 2009. The Fed also announced that it was expanding the scope of the TALF program to allow loans against additional types of collateral.

==== Arguments for credit easing ====
According to Ben Bernanke, expansion of the Fed balance sheet means the Fed is electronically creating money, necessary "... because our economy is very weak and inflation is very low. When the economy begins to recover, that will be the time that we need to unwind those programs, raise interest rates, reduce the money supply, and make sure that we have a recovery that does not involve inflation."

==== Arguments against credit easing ====
Credit easing involves increasing the money supply, which presents inflationary risks that could weaken the dollar and make it less desirable as a reserve currency, affecting the ability of the U.S. government to finance budget deficits. The Fed is lending against increasingly risky collateral and in great amounts. The challenge to reduce the money supply at the right cadence and amount will be unprecedented once the economy is on firmer footing. Further, reducing the money supply as the economy begins to recover may place downward pressure against economic growth. In other words, raising the money supply to cushion a downturn will have a dampening effect on the subsequent upturn. There is also risk of inflation and devaluation of the currency. Critics have argued that worthy borrowers can still get credit and that credit easing (and government intervention more generally) is really an attempt to maintain a debt-driven standard of living that was unsustainable.

== Solvency ==
Critics have argued that due to the combination of high leverage and losses, the U.S. banking system is effectively insolvent (i.e., equity is negative or will be as the crisis progresses), while the banks counter that they have the cash required to continue operating or are "well-capitalized." As the crisis progressed into mid-2008, it became apparent that growing losses on mortgage-backed securities at large, systemically important institutions were reducing the total value of assets held by particular firms to a critical point roughly equal to the value of their liabilities.

A bit of accounting theory is helpful to understanding this debate. It is an accounting identity (i.e., a rule that must hold true by definition) that assets equals the sum of liabilities and equity. Equity is primarily the common or preferred stock and the retained earnings of the company and is also referred to as capital. The financial statement that reflects these amounts is called the balance sheet. If a firm is forced into a negative equity scenario, it is technically insolvent from a balance sheet perspective. However, the firm may have sufficient cash to pay its short-term obligations and continue operating. Bankruptcy occurs when a firm is unable to pay its immediate obligations and seeks legal protection to enable it to either re-negotiate its arrangements with creditors or liquidate its assets. Pertinent forms of the accounting equation for this discussion are shown below:

- Assets = Liabilities + Equity
- Equity = Assets – Liabilities = Net worth or capital
- Financial leverage ratio = Assets / Equity

If assets equal liabilities, then equity must be zero. While asset values on the balance sheet are marked down to reflect expected losses, these institutions still owe the creditors the full amount of liabilities. To use a simplistic example, Company X used a $10 equity or capital base to borrow another $290 and invest the $300 amount in various assets, which then fall 10% in value to $270. This firm was "leveraged" 30:1 ($300 assets / $10 equity = 30) and now has assets worth $270, liabilities of $290 and equity of negative $20. Such leverage ratios were typical of the larger investment banks during 2007. At 30:1 leverage, it only takes a 3.33% loss to reduce equity to zero.

Banks use various regulatory measures to describe their financial strength, such as tier 1 capital. Such measures typically start with equity and then add or subtract other measures. Banks and regulators have been criticized for including relatively "weaker" or less tangible amounts in regulatory capital measures. For example, deferred tax assets (which represent future tax savings if a company makes a profit) and intangible assets (e.g., non-cash amounts like goodwill or trademarks) have been included in tier 1 capital calculations by some financial institutions. In other cases, banks were legally able to move liabilities off their balance sheets via structured investment vehicles, which improved their ratios. Critics suggest using the "tangible common equity" measure, which removes non-cash assets from these measures. Generally, the ratio of tangible common equity to assets is lower (i.e., more conservative) than the tier 1 ratio.

=== Nationalization ===
Nationalization typically involves the assumption of either full or partial control over a financial institution as part of a bailout. The board and senior management is replaced. Full nationalization means current equity shareholders are entirely wiped out and bondholders may or may not receive a "haircut," meaning a write-down on the value of the debt owed to them. Suppliers are generally paid fully by the government. Once the bank is again healthy, it can either be sold to the public for a one time profit, or can be held by the government as an income generating asset, which can permit lower taxes going forward.

==== Arguments for nationalization or recapitalization ====
Permanent nationalization of certain financial functions may be an effective way to maintain financial system stability and prevent future crisis. There is strong evidence that within the U.S., competition between mortgage securitizers contributed to declining underwriting standards and increased risk that led to the 2008 financial crisis. The largest, most powerful entities – with the strongest ties to the government and the heaviest regulatory burdens – generally originated the safest, best performing mortgages. Furthermore, the period of greatest competition coincided with the period during which the worst loans were originated. In addition, countries with less competitive financial sectors and greater government involvement in finance proved to be far more stable and resilient than the United States in the late 2000s (decade).

Another advantage of nationalization is that it eliminates the moral hazard inherent in private ownership of systemically important financial institutions. Systemically important financial institutions are likely to receive government bailouts in the event of failure. Unless these bailouts are structured as a government takeover, and losses are imposed on bondholders and shareholders, investors have incentives to take extreme risks, to capture the upside during boom times, and to impose losses on taxpayers in times of crisis. Permanent nationalization eliminates this dynamic by concentrating the full upside and downside with taxpayers. Permanent nationalization therefore may lead to lower and more rational risk levels in the financial system.

Permanent nationalization also provides the government with profits, a source of income – other than taxes – which can be used to recoup losses from past bailouts or to build a reserve for future bailouts. The political power of the owners and top executives and board members of private, systemically important financial institutions may insulate them from taxes, insurance charges, and regulations aimed at curbing risk. Nationalization could be an effective way to curb this political power and open the door to reform.

Another advantage of nationalization is that it gives the government greater knowledge, understanding, and capabilities within the financial markets, and may enhance the government's ability to act effectively during times of crisis.

Economist Paul Krugman has argued for bank nationalization: "A better approach would be to do what the government did with zombie savings and loans at the end of the 1980s: it seized the defunct banks, cleaning out the shareholders. Then it transferred their bad assets to a special institution, the Resolution Trust Corporation; paid off enough of the banks’ debts to make them solvent; and sold the fixed-up banks to new owners." He advocates an "explicit, though temporary government takeover" of insolvent banks.

Economist Nouriel Roubini said: "I'm worried that many banks [are] zombies, they should be shut down, the sooner the better ... otherwise they will take deposits and make other risky loans." He also wrote: "Nationalization is the only option that would permit us to solve the problem of toxic assets in an orderly fashion and finally allow lending to resume." He recommended four steps:

1. Determine which banks are insolvent.
2. Immediately nationalize insolvent institutions or place them into receivership. The equity holders will be wiped out, and long-term debt holders will have claims only after the depositors and other short-term creditors are paid off.
3. Separate nationalized bank assets into good and bad pools. Banks carrying only the good assets would then be privatized.
4. Bad assets would be merged into one enterprise. The assets could be held to maturity or eventually sold off with the gains and risks accruing to the taxpayers.

Harvard professor Niall Ferguson argued: "Worst of all [indebted] are the banks. The best evidence that we are in denial about this is the widespread belief that the crisis can be overcome by creating yet more debt ... banks that are de facto insolvent need to be restructured – a word that is preferable to the old-fashioned “nationalisation”. Existing shareholders will have to face that they have lost their money. Too bad; they should have kept a more vigilant eye on the people running their banks. Government will take control in return for a substantial recapitalisation after losses have meaningfully been written down."

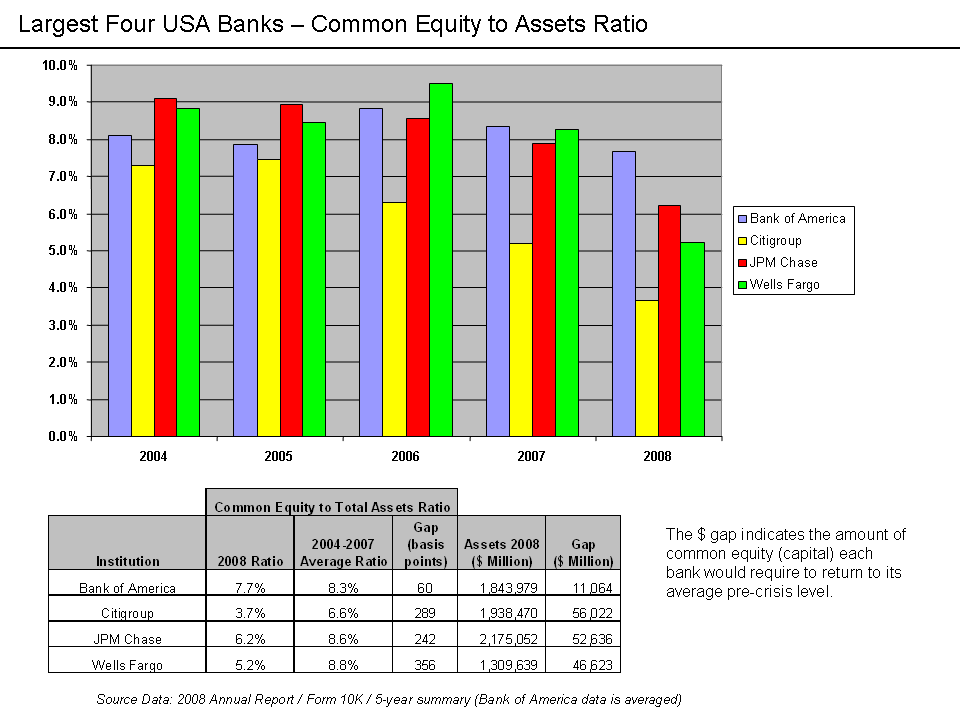
Common Equity to Total Assets Ratios for Major USA Banks

Banks that are insolvent from a balance sheet perspective (i.e., liabilities exceed assets, meaning equity is negative) may restrict their lending. Further, they are at increased risk of making risky financial bets due to moral hazard (i.e., either they make money if the bets work out or will be bailed out by the government, a dangerous position from society's point of view). An unstable banking system also undermines economic confidence.

These factors (among others) are why insolvent financial institutions have historically been taken over by regulators. Further, loans to a struggling bank increase assets and liabilities, not equity. Capital is therefore "tied up" on the insolvent bank's balance sheet and cannot be used as productively as it could be at a healthier financial institution. Banks have taken significant steps to obtain additional capital from private sources. Further, the U.S. and other countries have injected capital (willingly or unwillingly) into larger financial institutions. Alan Greenspan estimated in March 2009 that U.S. banks will require another $850 billion of capital, representing a 3-4 percentage point increase in equity capital to asset ratios.

Following a model initiated by the United Kingdom bank rescue package, the U.S. government authorized the injection of up to $350 billion in equity in the form of preferred stock or asset purchases as part of the $700 billion Emergency Economic Stabilization Act of 2008, also called the Troubled Asset Relief Program (TARP).

Steven Pearlstein has advocated government guarantees for new preferred stock, to encourage investors to provide private capital to the banks.

For a summary of U.S. government financial commitments and investments related to the crisis, see CNN – Bailout Scorecard.

For a summary of TARP funds provided to U.S. banks as of December 2008, see Reuters-TARP Funds.

==== Arguments against nationalization or recapitalization ====
Nationalization wipes out current shareholders and may impact bondholders. It involves risk to taxpayers, who may or may not recoup their investment. The government may not be able to manage the institution better than the current management. The threat of nationalization may make it challenging for banks to obtain funding from private sources.

Government intervention may not always be fair or transparent. Who gets a bailout and how much? A Congressional Oversight Panel (COP) chaired by Harvard Professor Elizabeth Warren was created to monitor the implementation of the TARP program. COP issued its first report on 10 December 2008. In related interviews, Professor Warren indicated it was difficult to obtain clear answers to her panel's questions.

=== "Toxic" or "Legacy" asset purchases ===
Another method of recapitalizing institutions is for the government or private investors to purchase assets that are significantly reduced in value due to payment delinquency, whether related to mortgages, credit cards, auto loans, etc. A summary of the pro- and con- arguments is included at: Brookings – The Administrations New Financial Rescue Plan and Brookings – Choosing Among the Options

==== Arguments for toxic asset purchases ====
Removing complex and difficult to value assets from banks' balance sheets across the system in exchange for cash is a major win for the banks, provided they can command an appropriate price for the assets. Further, transparency of financial institution health is improved across the system, improving confidence, as investors can be more assured of the valuation of these firms. Financially healthy firms are more likely to lend.

U.S. Treasury Secretary Timothy Geithner announced a plan during March 2009 to purchase "legacy" or "toxic" assets from banks. The Public-Private Partnership Investment Program involves government loans and guarantees to encourage private investors to provide funds to purchase toxic assets from banks. The press release states: "This approach is superior to the alternatives of either hoping for banks to gradually work these assets off their books or of the government purchasing the assets directly. Simply hoping for banks to work legacy assets off over time risks prolonging a financial crisis, as in the case of the Japanese experience. But if the government acts alone in directly purchasing legacy assets, taxpayers will take on all the risk of such purchases – along with the additional risk that taxpayers will overpay if government employees are setting the price for those assets."

==== Arguments against toxic asset purchases ====
A key question is what to pay for the assets. For example, a bank may believe an asset, such as a mortgage-backed security with a claim on cash from the underlying mortgages, is worth 50 cents on the dollar, while it may only be able to find a buyer on the open market for 30 cents. The bank has no incentive to sell the assets at the 30 cent price. But if taxpayers pay 50 cents, they are paying more than market value, an unpopular choice for taxpayers and politicians in a bailout. To truly be helping the banks, the taxpayers would have to pay more than the value at which the bank is carrying the asset on its books, or more than the 50 cent price. Further, who will determine the price and how will ownership of the assets be administered? Does the government entity set up to make these purchases have the expertise?

Economist Joseph Stiglitz criticized the plan proposed by U.S. Treasury Secretary Timothy Geithner to purchase toxic assets: "Paying fair market values for the assets will not work. Only by overpaying for the assets will the banks be adequately recapitalized. But overpaying for the assets simply shifts the losses to the government. In other words, the Geithner plan works only if and when the taxpayer loses big time." He stated that toxic asset purchases represents "ersatz capitalism," meaning gains are privatized while losses are socialized.

The government's initial Troubled Asset Relief Program (TARP) proposal was derailed because of these questions and because of the timeline involved in successfully valuing, purchasing, and administering such a program was too long with an imminent crisis faced in September–October 2008.

Martin Wolf has argued that the purchase of toxic assets may distract the U.S. Congress from the urgent need to recapitalize banks and may make it more politically difficult to take necessary action.

Research by JP Morgan and Wachovia indicates that the value of toxic assets (technically CDO's of ABS) issued during late 2005 to mid-2007 are worth between 5 cents and 32 cents on the dollar. Approximately $305 billion of the $450 billion of such assets created during the period are in default. By another indicator (the ABX), toxic assets are worth about 40 cents on the dollar, depending on the precise vintage (period of origin).

=== Bondholder and counterparty haircuts ===
As of March 2009, bondholders at financial institutions that received government bailout funds have not been forced to take a "haircut" or reduction in the principal amount and interest payments on their bonds. A partial conversion of debt to equity is fairly common in Chapter 11 bankruptcy proceedings, as the common stock shareholders are wiped out and the bondholders effectively become the new owners. This is another way to increase equity capital in the bank, as the liability amount on the balance sheet is reduced. For example, assume a bank has assets and liabilities of $100 and therefore equity is zero. In a bankruptcy proceeding or nationalization, bondholders may have the value of their bonds reduced to $80. This creates equity of $20 immediately ($100–80=$20).

A key aspect of the AIG scandal is that over $100 billion in taxpayer funds have been channeled through AIG to major global financial institutions (its counterparties) that have already received separate, significant bailout funds in many cases. The amounts paid to counterparties were at 100 cents on the dollar. In other words, funds are provided to AIG by the U.S. government so that it can pay other companies, in effect making it a "bailout clearinghouse." Members of the U.S. Congress demanded that AIG indicate to whom it is distributing taxpayer bailout funds and to what extent these trading partners are sharing in losses. Key institutions receiving additional bailout funds channeled through AIG included a "who's who" of major global institutions. This included $12.9 billion paid to Goldman Sachs, which reported a profit of $2.3 billion for 2008. A list of the amounts by country and counterparty is here: Business Week – List of Counterparties and Payouts

==== Arguments for bondholder and counterparty haircuts ====
If the key issue is bank solvency, converting debt to equity via bondholder haircuts presents an elegant solution to the problem. Not only is debt reduced along with interest payments, but equity is simultaneously increased. Investors can then have more confidence that the bank (and financial system more broadly) is solvent, helping unfreeze credit markets. Taxpayers do not have to contribute money and the government may be able to just provide guarantees in the short-term to further support confidence in the recapitalized institution.

Economist Joseph Stiglitz testified that bank bailouts "... are really bailouts not of the enterprises but of the shareholders and especially bondholders. There is no reason that American taxpayers should be doing this." He wrote that reducing bank debt levels by converting debt into equity will increase confidence in the financial system. He believes that addressing bank solvency in this way would help address credit market liquidity issues.

Fed Chairman Ben Bernanke argued in March 2009: "If a federal agency had had such tools on September 16 [2008], they could have been used to put AIG into conservatorship or receivership, unwind it slowly, protect policyholders, and impose haircuts on creditors and counterparties as appropriate. That outcome would have been far preferable to the situation we find ourselves in now."

Harvard professor Niall Ferguson has argued for bondholder haircuts at insolvent banks: "Bondholders may have to accept either a debt-for-equity swap or a 20 per cent “haircut” (a reduction in the value of their bonds) – a disappointment, no doubt, but nothing compared with the losses when Lehman went under."

Economist Jeffrey Sachs has also argued for bondholder haircuts: "The cheaper and more equitable way would be to make shareholders and bank bondholders take the hit rather than the taxpayer. The Fed and other bank regulators would insist that bad loans be written down on the books. Bondholders would take haircuts, but these losses are already priced into deeply discounted bond prices."

Dr. John Hussman has argued for significant bondholder haircuts: "Stabilize insolvent financial institutions through receivership if the bondholders of the institution are unwilling to swap debt for equity. In virtually all cases, the liabilities of these companies to their own bondholders are capable of fully absorbing all losses without the need for public funds to defend those bondholders ... The sum total of the policy responses to this crisis has been to defend the bondholders of distressed financial institutions at public expense."

Professor and author Nassim Nicholas Taleb argued during July 2009 that deleveraging through forcible conversion of debt to equity swaps for both banks and homeowners is "the only solution." He advocates much more aggressive and system-wide action. He emphasized the complexity and fragility of the current system due to excessive debt levels and stated that the system is in the process of crashing. He believes any "green shoots" (i.e., signs of recovery) should not distract from this response.

==== Arguments against bondholder and counterparty haircuts ====
Investors may balk at providing funding to U.S. institutions if bonds become subject to arbitrary haircuts due to nationalization. Insurance companies and other investors that own many of the bonds issued by major financial institutions may suffer large losses if they must accept debt for equity swaps or other forms of haircuts.

The fear of losing one's investments which is contributing to the recession would increase with each expropriation.

== Economic stimulus and fiscal policy ==
Between June 2007 and November 2008, Americans lost a total of $8.3 trillion in wealth between housing and stock market losses, contributing to a decline in consumer spending and business investment. The crisis has caused unemployment to rise and GDP to decline at a significant annual rate during Q4 2008.

On 13 February 2008, former President George W. Bush signed into law a $168 billion (~$246 billion in 2025) economic stimulus package, mainly taking the form of income tax rebate checks mailed directly to taxpayers. Checks were mailed starting the week of 28 April 2008.

On 17 February 2009, U.S. President Barack Obama signed the American Recovery and Reinvestment Act of 2009 (ARRA), an $800 billion (~$1.17 trillion in 2025) stimulus package with a broad spectrum of spending and tax cuts.

=== Arguments for stimulus by spending ===
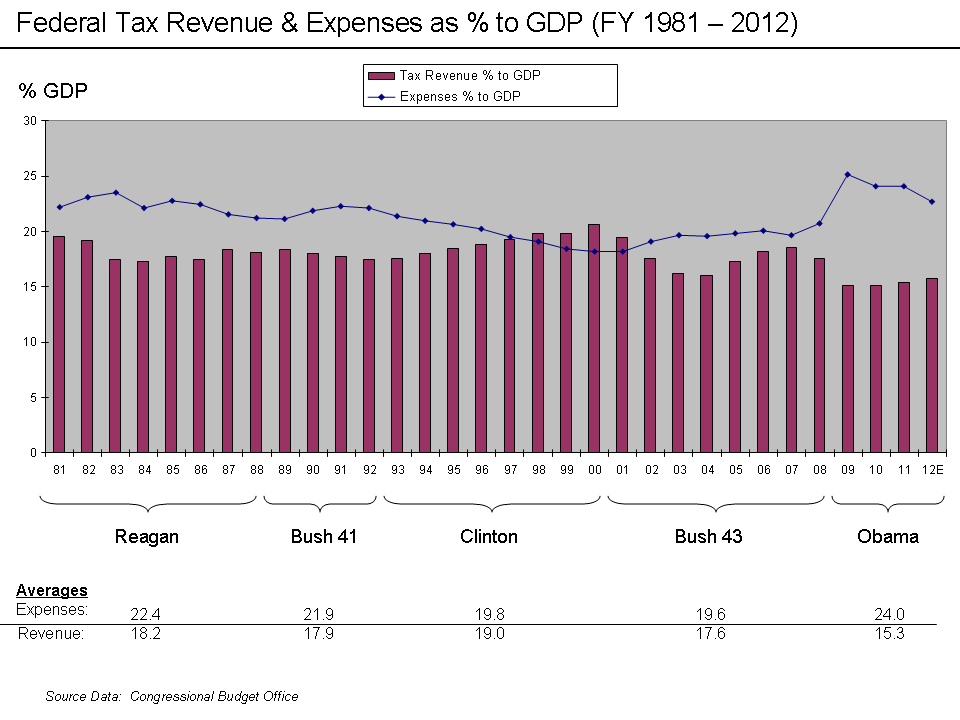
Revenue and Expense as % GDP

Keynesian economics suggests deficit spending by governments to offset declines in consumer spending and business investment can help increase economic activity. Economist Paul Krugman has argued that the U.S. stimulus should be approximately $1.3 trillion over 3 years, even larger than the $800 billion enacted into law by President Barack Obama, or roughly 4% of GDP annually for 2–3 years. Krugman has argued for a strong stimulus to address the risk of another depression and deflation, in which prices, wages, and economic growth spiral downward in a self-reinforcing cycle.

President Obama argued his rationale for ARRA and his spending priorities in his speech of February 25, 2009, to a joint session of Congress. He argued that energy independence, healthcare reform, and education merit significant investment or spending increases.

Economists Alan Blinder and Alan Auerbach both advocated short-term stimulus spending in June 2009 to help ensure the economy does not slip into a deeper recession, but then reinstating fiscal discipline in the medium- to long-term.

Economists debate the relative merit of tax cuts vs. spending increases as economic stimulus. Economists in President Obama's administration have argued that spending on infrastructure such as roads and bridges has a higher impact on GDP and jobs than tax cuts.

Economist Joseph Stiglitz explained that stimulus can be seen as an investment and not just as spending, if used properly: "Wise government investments yield returns far higher than the interest rate the government pays on its debt; in the long run, investments help reduce deficits."

=== Arguments against stimulus by spending ===
Harvard professor Niall Ferguson wrote: "The reality being repressed is that the western world is suffering a crisis of excessive indebtedness. Many governments are too highly leveraged, as are many corporations. More importantly, households are groaning under unprecedented debt burdens. Worst of all are the banks. The best evidence that we are in denial about this is the widespread belief that the crisis can be overcome by creating yet more debt."

Many economists recognize that the U.S. is facing a series of long-term funding challenges related to Social security and healthcare. Fed Chairman Ben Bernanke said on October 4, 2006: "Reform of our unsustainable entitlement programs should be a priority." He added, "the imperative to undertake reform earlier rather than later is great." He discussed how borrowing to enable deficit spending increases the national debt, which poses questions of inter-generational equity, meaning the right of current generations to increase the burden on future generations.

Economist Peter Schiff has argued that the U.S. economy is resetting at a lower level and stimulus spending will not be effective and only raise debt levels: "America's GDP is composed of more than 70% consumer spending. For many years, much of that spending has been a function of voracious consumer borrowing through home equity extractions (averaging more than $850 billion annually in 2005 and 2006, according to the Federal Reserve) and rapid expansion of credit card and other consumer debt. Now that credit is scarce, it is inevitable that GDP will fall. Neither the left nor the right of the American political spectrum has shown any willingness to tolerate such a contraction." He argues further that U.S. budgetary assumptions mean certain wealthy nations must continue to fund annual trillion dollar deficits indefinitely, for a 2-3% Treasury bond return, without significant net redemption to fund domestic programs, which he considers highly unlikely.

While commenting on the G20 summit, economist John B. Taylor said "This financial crisis was caused and prolonged largely by government excesses in the fiscal and monetary policy areas, and continued excess as far as the eye can see will neither end the crisis nor prevent further ones.".

Prominent Republicans have strongly criticized President Obama's 2010 budget, which includes $900 billion or larger annual increases in the national debt through 2019 (Schedule S-9).

A large amount of real wealth was destroyed during the boom (the realization of which fact constitutes the bust). Consequently, the private sector needs to rebuild what is missing. Spending by the government during this period diverts resources from that rebuilding and prolongs the recession. Conservatives argue it would be better to cut government spending. This would reduce the cost of inputs used by businesses which would allow them to expand and hire more workers.

=== Arguments for stimulus by tax cuts ===
Conservatives and supply-side economists argue that the best stimulus would be to lower marginal tax rates. This would allow businesses to expand those investments which are truly productive and heal the economy. They note that this worked when presidents Kennedy and Reagan cut taxes.

=== Arguments against stimulus by tax cuts ===
There is significant debate among economists regarding which type of fiscal stimulus (e.g., spending, investment, or tax cuts) generates the largest "bang for the buck," which is technically called a fiscal multiplier. For example, a stimulus of $100 billion that generates $150 billion of incremental economic growth (GDP) would have a multiplier of 1.5. Since the U.S. Federal government has historically collected about 18% of GDP in tax revenue, a multiplier of approximately 5.56 (1 divided by 18%) would be required to prevent a deficit increase from any type of stimulus. Technically, the larger the multiplier, the less the impact on the deficit because the incremental economic activity is taxed.

Various economic studies place the fiscal multiplier from stimulus between zero and 2.5. In testimony before the Financial Crisis Inquiry Commission, economist Mark Zandi reported that infrastructure investment provided a high multiplier as part of the American Recovery and Reinvestment Act, while spending provided a moderate to high multiplier and tax cuts had the lowest multiplier. His conclusions by category were:

- Tax cuts: 0.32-1.30
- Spending: 1.13-1.74
- Investment: 1.57

During May 2009 the Whitehouse Council of Economic Advisors estimated that the American Recovery and Reinvestment Act spending elements would have multipliers between 1.0 and 1.5, while tax cuts would have multipliers between 0 and 1. The report states that these conclusions "... are broadly similar to those implied by the Federal Reserve’s FRB/US model and the models of leading private forecasters, such as Macroeconomic Advisers."

Supply side economists have argued that tax rate cuts have a multiplier sufficient to actually raise government revenues (i.e., greater than 5.5). However, this is disputed by research from the Congressional Budget Office, Harvard University, and the U.S. Treasury Department. The Center on Budget and Policy Priorities (CBPP) summarized a variety of studies done by economists across the political spectrum that indicated tax cuts do not pay for themselves and increase deficits.

To summarize the above studies, infrastructure investment and spending are more effective stimulus measures than tax cuts, due to their higher multipliers. However, any type of stimulus spending increases the deficit.

== Government bailouts ==
=== Arguments for bailouts ===
Governments may intervene because of the belief that an institution is "too big to fail" or "too interconnected to fail", meaning that allowing them to enter bankruptcy would create or increase systemic risk, meaning disruptions to the credit markets and to the real economy.

Bank failures are widely believed to have led to the Great Depression, and since WWII, nearly every government – including the U.S. in the 1980s, 1990s, and 2000s (decade) – has chosen to bail out its financial sector in times of crisis. Whatever the negative consequences of bailouts, the consequences of not bailing out the financial system – economic collapse, protracted GDP contraction, and high unemployment – may be even worse.

For these reasons, even political leaders who are theoretically ideologically opposed to bailouts have generally supported them in times of crisis. In a dramatic meeting on September 18, 2008, Treasury Secretary Henry Paulson and Fed Chairman Ben Bernanke met with key legislators to propose a $700 billion (~$1.03 trillion in 2025) emergency bailout of the banking system. Bernanke reportedly told them: "If we don't do this, we may not have an economy on Monday." The Emergency Economic Stabilization Act, also called the Troubled Asset Relief Program (TARP), was signed into law on October 3, 2008.

Ben Bernanke also described his rationale for the AIG bailout as a "difficult but necessary step to protect our economy and stabilize our financial system." AIG had $952 billion (~$1.42 trillion in 2025) in liabilities according to its 2007 annual report; its bankruptcy would have made the payment of these liabilities uncertain. Banks, municipalities, and insurers could have suffered significant financial losses, with unpredictable and potentially significant consequences. In the context of the dramatic business failures and takeovers of September 2008, he was unwilling to allow another large bankruptcy such as Lehman Brothers, which had caused a run on money-market funds and caused a crisis of confidence that brought interbank lending to a standstill.

=== Arguments against bailouts ===
- Signals lower business standards for giant companies by incentivizing risk
- Creates moral hazard through the assurance of safety nets
- Instills a corporatist style of government in which businesses use the state's power to forcibly extract money from taxpayers.
- Promotes centralized bureaucracy by allowing government powers to choose the terms of the bailout
- Instills a socialistic style of government in which government creates and maintains control over businesses.

On November 24, 2008, Republican Congressman Ron Paul (R-TX) wrote, "In bailing out failing companies, they are confiscating money from productive members of the economy and giving it to failing ones. By sustaining companies with obsolete or unsustainable business models, the government prevents their resources from being liquidated and made available to other companies that can put them to better, more productive use. An essential element of a healthy free market, is that both success and failure must be permitted to happen when they are earned. But instead with a bailout, the rewards are reversed – the proceeds from successful entities are given to failing ones. How this is supposed to be good for our economy is beyond me. ... It won’t work. It can’t work ... It is obvious to most Americans that we need to reject corporate cronyism, and allow the natural regulations and incentives of the free market to pick the winners and losers in our economy, not the whims of bureaucrats and politicians."

Nicole Gelinas, a writer affiliated with the Manhattan Institute think tank, wrote in March 2009: "In place of a wrenching but consistent and well-tested process [bankruptcy] of winding down a failed company, what have we chosen? A world of investors who can never be sure, in the future, that if they put their money into a company that fails, they can depend on a reliable process to recoup some of their funds. Instead, they may find themselves at the mercy of a government veering from whim to whim as it reads the mood of a volatile public ... In saving the remnants of failed companies from free-market failures, Washington may be sacrificing the public’s confidence that the government can ensure that free markets are reasonably fair and impartial. One year into an era of exhausting and arbitrary bailouts, it’s not clear that our policy of destroying the system in order to save it is going to work."

Bailouts can be costly for taxpayers. In 2002, World Bank reported that country bailouts cost an average of 13% of GDP. Based on U.S. GDP of $14 trillion in 2008, this would be approximately $1.8 trillion.

== Homeowner assistance ==
A variety of voluntary private and government-administered or supported programs were implemented during 2007-2009 to assist homeowners with case-by-case mortgage assistance, to mitigate the foreclosure crisis engulfing the U.S. Examples include the Housing and Economic Recovery Act of 2008, Hope Now Alliance, and Homeowners Affordability and Stability Plan. These all operate under the paradigm of "one-at-a-time" or "case-by-case" loan modification, as opposed to automated or systemic loan modification. They typically offer incentives to various parties involved to help homeowners stay in their homes.

There are four primary variables that can be adjusted to lower monthly payments and help homeowners: 1) Reduce the interest rate; 2) Reduce the loan principal amount; 3) Extend the mortgage term, such as from 30 to 40 years; and 4) Convert variable-rate ARM mortgages to fixed-rate.

=== Arguments for systematic refinancing ===
The Economist described the issue this way: "No part of the financial crisis has received so much attention, with so little to show for it, as the tidal wave of home foreclosures sweeping over America. Government programmes have been ineffectual, and private efforts not much better." Up to 9 million homes may enter foreclosure over the 2009-2011 period, versus one million in a typical year.

Critics have argued that the case-by-case loan modification method is ineffective, with too few homeowners assisted relative to the number of foreclosures and with nearly 40% of those assisted homeowners again becoming delinquent within 8 months.

On 18 February 2009, economists Nouriel Roubini and Mark Zandi recommended an "across the board" (systemic) reduction of mortgage principal balances by as much as 20-30%. Lowering the mortgage balance would help lower monthly payments and also address an estimated 20 million homeowners that may have a financial incentive to enter voluntary foreclosure because they are "underwater" (i.e., the mortgage balance is larger than the home value).

Roubini further argued that mortgage balances could be reduced in exchange for the lender receiving a warrant that entitles them to some of the future home appreciation, in effect swapping mortgage debt for equity. This is analogous to the bondholder haircut concept discussed above.

Harvard professor Niall Ferguson wrote: "... we need ... a generalised conversion of American mortgages to lower interest rates and longer maturities. The idea of modifying mortgages appals legal purists as a violation of the sanctity of contract. But there are times when the public interest requires us to honour the rule of law in the breach. Repeatedly during the course of the 19th century governments changed the terms of bonds that they issued through a process known as “conversion”. A bond with a 5 per cent coupon would simply be exchanged for one with a 3 per cent coupon, to take account of falling market rates and prices. Such procedures were seldom stigmatised as default. Today, in the same way, we need an orderly conversion of adjustable rate mortgages to take account of the fundamentally altered financial environment."

The State Foreclosure Prevention Working Group, a coalition of state attorneys general and bank regulators from 11 states, reported in April 2008 that loan servicers could not keep up with the rising number of foreclosures. 70% of subprime mortgage holders are not getting the help they need. Nearly two-thirds of loan workouts require more than six weeks to complete under the current "case-by-case" method of review. In order to slow the growth of foreclosures, the Group has recommended a more automated method of loan modification that can be applied to large blocks of struggling borrowers.

In December 2008, the U.S. FDIC reported that more than half of mortgages modified during the first half of 2008 were delinquent again, in many cases because payments were not reduced or mortgage debt was not forgiven. This is further evidence that case-by-case loan modification is not effective as a policy tool.

A report released in April 2009 by the Office of the Comptroller of the Currency and Office of Thrift Supervision indicated that fewer than half of loan modifications during 2008 reduced homeowner payments by more than 10%. Nearly one in four loan modifications during the fourth quarter of 2008 actually increased monthly payments. Nine months after modification, 26% of loans where monthly payments were reduced by 10% or more were again delinquent, versus 50% where payment amounts were unchanged. The U.S. Comptroller stated: "... modification strategies that result in unchanged or increased monthly payments run the risk of unacceptably high re-default rates."

It is the inability of homeowners to pay their mortgages that causes mortgage-backed securities to become "toxic" on the banks balance sheets. To use an analogy, it is the "upstream" problem of homeowners defaulting that creates toxic assets and banking insolvency "downstream." By assisting homeowners "upstream" at the core of the problem, banks would be assisted "downstream," helping both parties with the same set of funds. However, the government's primary assistance through April 2009 has been to the banks, helping only the "downstream" party rather than both.

Economist Dean Baker has argued for systematically converting mortgages to rental arrangements for homeowners at risk of foreclosure, at considerably reduced monthly payment amounts. Homeowners would be allowed to remain in the home for a substantial period time (e.g., 5–10 years). Rents would be at 50-70% of the current mortgage amount. Homeowners would be given this option, indirectly forcing banks to be more aggressive in their refinancing decisions.

=== Arguments against systematic refinancing ===
Historically, loans were originated by banks and held by them. However, mortgages originated over the past few years have increasingly been packaged and sold to investors via complex instruments called mortgage-backed securities (MBSs) or collateralized debt obligations(CDO's). The contracts involved between the banks and investors may not allow systematic refinancing, as each loan must be individually approved by the investor or their delegates. Banks are concerned that they may face lawsuits if they unilaterally and systematically convert a large number of mortgages to more affordable terms. Such assistance may also further damage the financial condition of banks, although many have already written down MBS asset values and much of the impact would be absorbed by investors outside the banking system.

Breaking contracts would potentially lead to higher interest rates, as investors demand higher compensation for taking the risk that their contracts may be subject to homeowner bailouts or relief mandated by the government.

As with other government interventions, homeowner relief would create moral hazard – why should a potential homeowner make a down payment or limit himself to a house he can afford, if government is going to bail him out when he gets in trouble?

== Conflicts of interest ==
A variety of conflicts of interest were argued as contributing to this crisis:

- Private credit rating agencies are compensated for rating debt securities by those issuing the securities, who have an interest in seeing the most positive ratings applied. Critics argued for alternative funding mechanisms.
- There is a "revolving door" between major financial institutions, the Treasury Department, and Treasury bailout programs. For example, the former CEO of Goldman Sachs was Henry Paulson, who became President George W. Bush's Treasury Secretary.
- There is a "revolving door" between major financial institutions and the Securities and Exchange Commission (SEC), which is supposed to monitor them.

A precedent is the Sarbanes–Oxley Act of 2002, which implemented a "cooling-off period" between auditors and the firms they audit. The law prohibits auditors from auditing a publicly traded firm if the CEO or top financial management worked for the audit firm during the past year.

== Lobbying ==
Banks in the U.S. lobby politicians extensively, based on a November 2009 report from employees of the International Monetary Fund (IMF) writing independently of that organization. The study concluded that: "the prevention of future crises might require weakening political influence of the financial industry or closer monitoring of lobbying activities to understand better the incentives behind it."

The Boston Globe reported during that during January–June 2009, the largest four U.S. banks spent a combined $9.1 million on lobbying, with Citigroup spending $3.1 million; JP Morgan Chase $3.1 million; Bank of America $1.5 million; and Wells Fargo $1.4 million, despite receiving taxpayer bailouts.

Prior to the crisis, banks that lobbied most aggressively also engaged in the riskiest practices. This suggests that the government was generally a force for caution and conservatism, while private industry lobbied for the ability to take greater risk.

After the 2008 financial crisis, the financial services industry mounted an aggressive public relations and lobbying campaign designed to suggest that government policy rather than corporate policy caused the financial crisis. These arguments were made most aggressively by Peter Wallison of the American Enterprise Institute, a former Wall Street lawyer, Republican political figure, and longtime advocate of financial deregulation and privatization.

== Regulation ==
President Barack Obama and key advisors introduced a series of regulatory proposals in June 2009. The proposals address consumer protection, executive pay, bank financial cushions or capital requirements, expanded regulation of the shadow banking system and derivatives, and enhanced authority for the Federal Reserve to safely wind-down systemically important institutions, among others.

=== Systemic risk regulator ===
The purpose of a systemic risk regulator would be to address the failure of any entity of sufficient scale that a disorderly failure would threaten the financial system. Such a regulator would be designed to address failures of entities such as Lehman Brothers and AIG more effectively.

==== Arguments for a systemic risk regulator ====
Fed Chairman Ben Bernanke stated there is a need for "well-defined procedures and authorities for dealing with the potential failure of a systemically important non-bank financial institution." He also argued in March 2009: "... I would note that AIG offers two clear lessons for the upcoming discussion in the Congress and elsewhere on regulatory reform. First, AIG highlights the urgent need for new resolution procedures for systemically important nonbank financial firms. If a federal agency had had such tools on September 16, they could have been used to put AIG into conservatorship or receivership, unwind it slowly, protect policyholders, and impose haircuts on creditors and counterparties as appropriate. That outcome would have been far preferable to the situation we find ourselves in now. Second, the AIG situation highlights the need for strong, effective consolidated supervision of all systemically important financial firms. AIG built up its concentrated exposure to the subprime mortgage market largely out of the sight of its functional regulators. More-effective supervision might have identified and blocked the extraordinarily reckless risk-taking at AIG-FP. These two changes could measurably reduce the likelihood of future episodes of systemic risk like the one we faced at AIG."

Economists Nouriel Roubini and Lasse Pederson recommended in January 2009 that capital requirements for financial institutions be proportional to the systemic risk they pose, based on an assessment by regulators. Further, each financial institution would pay an insurance premium to the government based on its systemic risk.

British Prime Minister Gordon Brown and Nobel laureate Michael Spence have argued for an "early warning system" to help detect a confluence of events leading to systemic risk.

Former Federal Reserve Chairman Paul Volcker testified in September 2009 regarding how to deal with a systemically important non-bank that might get into trouble:

1. A government entity should have the authority to take over a failed or failing non-bank institution and manage that institution.
2. The regulator should attempt to find a merger partner. If no partner can be found, the entity should ask debtholders to exchange debt for equity to make the company solvent again.
3. If none of the above works, the regulator should arrange an orderly liquidation.

Volcker argued that none of the above involves injection of government or taxpayer money but involves an organized procedure for winding down a systemically important non-banking institutions. He advocated that this authority should reside with the Federal Reserve rather than a council of regulators.

==== Arguments against a systemic risk regulator ====
Libertarians and conservatives argue for minimal or no regulation, preferring to let markets regulate themselves. Writers such as Peter Wallison, a former Wall Street lawyer, Republican political figure, and longtime advocate of financial deregulation and privatization, argue that it was government intervention, such as allegedly requiring Fannie Mae and Freddie Mac to lower lending standards, that caused the crisis in the first place and that extensive regulation of banks was ineffective.

Independent academic scholars have disputed these assertions, noting that Fannie Mae and Freddie Mac loans performed better than those securitized by more lightly regulated investment banks, and that government mandated CRA loans performed better than market driven subprime mortgages. They've also questioned Wallison's impartiality, noting extensive funding for AEI by the financial industry, and AEI's apparent efforts to increase financial industry donations by suggesting that Wallison would use his position on the Financial Crisis Inquiry Commission to benefit the Financial Industry. Critics have also raised questions about Wallison's methodology and use of data.

=== Regulating the shadow banking system ===
Unregulated financial institutions called the shadow banking system play a critical role in the credit markets. In a June 2008 speech, U.S. Treasury Secretary Timothy Geithner, then President and CEO of the NY Federal Reserve Bank, placed significant blame for the freezing of credit markets on a "run" on the entities in the "parallel" banking system, also called the shadow banking system. He described the significance of this unregulated banking system: "In early 2007, asset-backed commercial paper conduits, in structured investment vehicles, in auction-rate preferred securities, tender option bonds and variable rate demand notes, had a combined asset size of roughly $2.2 (~$3.29 billion in 2025) trillion. Assets financed overnight in triparty repo grew to $2.5 trillion. Assets held in hedge funds grew to roughly $1.8 trillion. The combined balance sheets of the then five major investment banks totaled $4 trillion. In comparison, the total assets of the top five bank holding companies in the United States at that point were just over $6 trillion, and total assets of the entire banking system were about $10 trillion." He stated that the "combined effect of these factors was a financial system vulnerable to self-reinforcing asset price and credit cycles."

The FDIC has the authority to take over a struggling depository bank and liquidate it in an orderly way; it lacks this authority for non-bank financial institutions that have become an increasingly important part of the credit markets.

==== Arguments for regulating the shadow banking system ====
Leverage ratios of investment banks increased significantly between 2003 and 2007.

Nobel laureate Paul Krugman described the run on the shadow banking system as the "core of what happened" to cause the crisis. "As the shadow banking system expanded to rival or even surpass conventional banking in importance, politicians and government officials should have realized that they were re-creating the kind of financial vulnerability that made the Great Depression possible – and they should have responded by extending regulations and the financial safety net to cover these new institutions. Influential figures should have proclaimed a simple rule: anything that does what a bank does, anything that has to be rescued in crises the way banks are, should be regulated like a bank." He referred to this lack of controls as "malign neglect."

Krugman wrote in April 2010: "What we need now are two things: (a) regulators need the authority to seize failing shadow banks, the way the Federal Deposit Insurance Corporation already has the authority to seize failing conventional banks, and (b) there have to be prudential limits on shadow banks, above all limits on their leverage."

The crisis surrounding the failure of Long-Term Capital Management in 1998 was an example of an unregulated shadow banking institution that many believed posed a systemic risk.

Economist Nouriel Roubini argued that market discipline, or free market incentives for depositors and investors to monitor banks to prevent excessive risk taking, breaks down when there is mania or bubble psychology inflating asset prices. People take excessive risks and ignore risk managers during these periods. Without proper regulation, the "law of the jungle" rules. Excessive financial innovation that is not controlled is "very risky." He stated: "Self-regulation is meaningless; it means no regulation."

Former Chairman and CEO of Citigroup Chuck Prince said in July 2007: "When the music stops, in terms of liquidity, things will be complicated. But as long as the music is playing, you’ve got to get up and dance. We’re still dancing." Market pressures to grow profits by taking increasing risks were significant throughout the boom period. The largest five investment banks (such as Bear Stearns and Lehman Brothers), were either taken over, liquidated, or converted to depository banks. These institutions had increased their leverage ratios, a measure of risk defined as the ratio of assets or debt to capital, significantly from 2003 to 2007 (see diagram).

==== Arguments against regulating the shadow banking system ====
Writers at the financial-industry-funded American Enterprise Institute and similar corporate-funded think tanks have claimed that banking regulations did not prevent the crisis, and that regulations therefore can never be effective. According to Peter J. Wallison of the American Enterprise Institute, "... the federal government had to commit several hundred billion dollars for a guarantee of Citigroup's assets, despite the fact that examiners from the Office of the Comptroller of the Currency (OCC) have been inside the bank full-time for years, supervising the operations of this giant institution under the broad powers granted by FDICIA to bank supervisors." He questions whether regulation is better than market discipline at preventing the failure of financial institutions, as follows:

- "The very existence of regulation – especially safety-and-soundness regulation – creates moral hazard and reduces market discipline. Market participants believe that if the government is looking over the shoulder of the regulated industry, it is able to control risk-taking, and lenders are thus less wary that regulated entities are assuming unusual or excessive risks.
- Regulation creates anticompetitive economies of scale. The costs of regulation are more easily borne by large companies than by small ones. Moreover, large companies have the ability to influence regulators to adopt regulations that favor their operations over those of smaller competitors, particularly when regulations add costs that smaller companies cannot bear.
- Regulation impairs innovation. Regulatory approvals necessary for new products or services delay implementation, give competitors an opportunity to imitate, and add costs to the process of developing new ways of doing business or new services.
- Regulation adds costs to consumer products. These costs are frequently not worth the additional amount that consumers are required to pay.
- Safety-and-soundness regulation in particular preserves weak managements and outdated business models, imposing long-term costs on society."

These industry funded think tanks have claimed that market bubbles are not caused by failure of a free market to control manias, but rather by government policy.

Others have disputed these claims.

=== Bank capital requirements & leverage restrictions ===
Nondepository banks (e.g., investment banks and mortgage companies) are not subject to the same capital requirements (or leverage restrictions) as depository banks. For example, the largest five investment banks were leveraged approximately 30:1 based on their 2007 financial statements, meaning that only a 3.33% decline in the value of their assets could make them insolvent as explained above. Many investment banks had limited capital to offset declines in their holdings of mortgage-backed securities, or to support their side of credit default insurance contracts. Insurance companies such as AIG did not have sufficient capital to support the amounts they were insuring and were unable to post the required collateral as the crisis deepened.

==== Arguments for stronger bank capital requirements / leverage restriction ====
Nobel prize winner Joseph Stiglitz has recommended that the USA adopt regulations restricting leverage, and preventing companies from becoming "too big to fail."

Alan Greenspan has called for banks to have a 14% capital ratio, rather than the historical 8-10%. Major U.S. banks had capital ratios of around 12% in December 2008 after the initial round of bailout funds. The minimum capital ratio is regulated.

Greenspan also wrote in March 2009: "New regulatory challenges arise because of the recently proven fact that some financial institutions have become too big to fail as their failure would raise systemic concerns. This status gives them a highly market-distorting special competitive advantage in pricing their debt and equities. The solution is to have graduated regulatory capital requirements to discourage them from becoming too big and to offset their competitive advantage." He estimated that another $850 billion will be required to properly capitalize major banks.

Economist Raghuram Rajan has argued for regulations requiring "contingent capital." For example, financial institutions would be required to pay insurance premiums to the government during boom periods, in exchange for payments during a downturn. Alternatively, they would issue debt that converts to equity during downturns or when certain capital thresholds are met, both reducing their interest burden and expanding their capital base to enable lending.

Economist Paul McCulley advocated "counter-cyclical regulatory policy to help modulate human nature." He cited the work of economist Hyman Minsky, who believed that human behavior is pro-cyclical, meaning it amplifies the extent of booms and busts. In other words, humans are momentum investors rather than value investors. Counter-cyclical policies would include increasing capital requirements during boom periods and reducing them during busts.

JP Morgan Chase CEO Jamie Dimon also supported increased capital requirements: "Also welcome in the administration's new proposals is the focus on strong capital and liquidity requirements – not just for traditional banks but for a broad range of financial institutions. We now know that "once-in-a-generation" swings in the business cycle are anything but. All financial institutions, wherever they're regulated, must stand ready with strong capital reserves to serve as a cushion during times of unexpected market and economic difficulties. This must be combined with adequate loan loss reserves, to cover the expected losses from the growing number of borrowers who likely will default, and necessary liquidity, in case credit markets freeze up as they did last fall."

==== Arguments against bank capital requirements / leverage restriction ====
Higher capital ratios or requirements mean banks cannot lend as much of their capital base, which increases interest rates and theoretically places downward pressure on economic growth relative to freer lending regulations.

During a boom (before the corresponding bust begins), even most economists are unable to distinguish the boom from a period of normal (but rapid) growth. Thus officials will be unwilling or politically unable to impose counter-cyclical policies during a boom. No one wants to take away the punch bowl just when the party is warming up.

=== Breaking up financial institutions that are "too big to fail" ===
Regulators and central bankers have argued that certain systemically important institutions not be allowed to fail, due to concerns regarding widespread disruption of credit markets.

==== Arguments for breaking-up large financial institutions ====
Economists Joseph Stiglitz and Simon Johnson have argued that institutions that are "too big to fail" should be broken up, perhaps by splitting them into smaller regional institutions. Dr. Stiglitz argued that big banks are more prone to taking excessive risks due to the availability of support by the federal government should their bets go bad.

Various Wall Street special interests would likely be weakened if major financial institutions are broken-up or no longer allowed to make campaign contributions. Further, restrictions could be placed more easily on the "revolving door" of executives between investment banks and various government agencies or departments. Similar rules regarding conflicts of interest were placed on accounting firms and the corporations they audit as part of the Sarbanes–Oxley Act of 2002.

The Glass–Steagall Act was enacted after the Great Depression. It separated commercial banks and investment banks, in part to avoid potential conflicts of interest between the lending activities of the former and rating activities of the latter. Economist Joseph Stiglitz criticized the repeal of key provisions of the Act. He called its repeal the "culmination of a $300 million lobbying effort by the banking and financial services industries ... spearheaded in Congress by Senator Phil Gramm." He believes it contributed to this crisis because the risk-taking culture of investment banking dominated the more conservative commercial banking culture, leading to increased levels of risk-taking and leverage during the boom period.

Martin Wolf wrote in June 2009: "A business that is too big to fail cannot be run in the interests of shareholders, since it is no longer part of the market. Either it must be possible to close it down or it has to be run in a different way. It is as simple – and brutal – as that."

Niall Ferguson wrote in September 2009: "What's needed is a serious application of antitrust law to the financial-services sector and a speedy end to institutions that are 'too big to fail.' In particular, the government needs to clarify that federal insurance applies only to bank deposits and that bank bondholders will no longer protected, as they have been in this crisis. In other words, when a bank goes bankrupt, the creditors should take the hit, not the taxpayers."

The New York Times editorial board wrote in December 2009: "If we have learned anything over the last couple of years, it is that banks that are too big to fail pose too much of a risk to the economy. Any serious effort to reform the financial system must ensure that no such banks exist."

President Barack Obama argued in January 2010 that depository banks should not be able to trade on their own accounts, which effectively brings back Glass-Steagall Act rules separating depository and investment banking. This is because taxpayers guarantee the deposits of depository banks and high-risk bets with that money would be inappropriate.

==== Arguments against breaking-up large financial institutions ====
There is evidence that certain financial functions may be more stable within an oligopolistic or monopolistic market structure, and that competition may contribute to declining standards and instability.

Some corporate customers may be inconvenienced by having to work with separate depository and investment banks, through the re-enactment of a law such as the Glass-Steagal Act.

=== Short-selling restrictions ===
Short-selling enables investors to make money when a stock or investment goes down in value. Short-sellers made enormous profits throughout the 2008 financial crisis.

==== Arguments for restricting short-selling ====
Some believe that bear raids or deliberate attempts to reduce the value of stocks caused the downfall of certain firms, such as Bear Stearns. Hedge funds or large investors with significant short positions allegedly began a rumor campaign, creating a crisis of confidence regarding the firm. Since it was financed by short-term loans that frequently required replenishment and was highly leveraged (i.e., vulnerable), such rumors may have contributed to bankrupting the firm as lenders refused to extend financing and investors pulled funds from the company.

On 18 September 2008, UK regulators announced a temporary ban on short-selling the stock of financial firms.

==== Arguments against restricting short-selling ====
The ratio of those "long" (i.e., those who are betting the stock will go up) or "short" (i.e., those who are betting the stock will go down) sends important signals regarding the future direction of the stock or expectations of future performance. Short selling is only harmful if it reduces the price of the investment below what its value should be. However, if that occurs, then the short seller would suffer a loss since the price would tend to go back up to its appropriate value; and too many such losses would put him out of business. Thus no regulation is needed. Short selling helps bring prices down to their appropriate level more quickly.

Bear raids (like bank runs) are only a danger to firms which are over-extended and thus deserve to fail.

=== Derivatives regulation ===
Credit derivatives such as credit default swaps (CDS) can be thought of as insurance policies that protect a lender from the risk of default by the borrower. Party A pays a premium to Party B, who agrees to pay Party A in the event Party C defaults on its obligations, such as bonds. CDS can be used to hedge or can be used speculatively. Derivatives usage grew dramatically in the years preceding the crisis. The volume of CDS outstanding increased 100-fold from 1998 to 2008, with estimates of the debt covered by CDS contracts, as of November 2008, ranging from US$33 to $47 trillion. Total over-the-counter (OTC) derivative notional value rose to $683 (~$1,001 in 2025) trillion by June 2008.

Author Michael Lewis wrote that CDS enabled speculators to stack bets on the same mortgage bonds and CDO's. This is analogous to allowing many persons to buy insurance on the same house. Speculators that bought CDS insurance were betting that significant defaults would occur, while the sellers (such as AIG) bet they would not.

==== Arguments for regulating credit derivatives ====
Warren Buffett famously referred to derivatives as "financial weapons of mass destruction" in early 2003. Former President Bill Clinton and former Federal Reserve Chairman Alan Greenspan indicated they did not properly regulate derivatives, including credit default swaps (CDS). A bill (the Derivatives Markets Transparency and Accountability Act of 2009 (H.R. 977) has been proposed to further regulate the CDS market and establish a clearinghouse. This bill would provide the authority to suspend CDS trading under certain conditions.

Economist Joseph Stiglitz summarized how CDS contributed to the systemic meltdown: "With this complicated intertwining of bets of great magnitude, no one could be sure of the financial position of anyone else-or even of one's own position. Not surprisingly, the credit markets froze."

NY Insurance Superintendent Eric Dinallo argued in April 2009 for the regulation of CDS and capital requirements sufficient to support financial commitments made by institutions. "Credit default swaps are the rocket fuel that turned the subprime mortgage fire into a conflagration. They were the major cause of AIG’s – and by extension the banks’ – problems. ... In sum, if you offer a guarantee – no matter whether you call it a banking deposit, an insurance policy, or a bet – regulation should ensure you have the capital to deliver." He also wrote that banks bought CDS to enable them to reduce the amount of capital they were required to hold against investments, thereby avoiding capital regulations.

Financier George Soros has recommended that credit default swaps no longer be traded, calling them "instruments of destruction that ought to be outlawed."

U.S. Treasury Secretary Timothy Geithner proposed a framework for legislation to regulate derivatives during May 2009, stating that "... derivatives are largely excluded or exempted from regulation." Key elements of the framework include:

- Require clearing of all standardized over-the-counter (OTC) derivatives through regulated central counterparties (CCPs);
- Robust margin and capital requirements for key market participants;
- Financial reporting and disclosure requirements;
- Clarify regulatory enforcement authorities of the U.S. Securities and Exchange Commission (SEC) and Commodity Futures Trading Commission (CFTC); and
- Limiting the types of counterparties that can participate in derivative transactions.

==== Arguments against regulating credit derivatives ====
Credit derivatives provide market signals regarding the risk of particular investments. For example, the cost of providing CDS protection for particular bonds is a signal regarding the risk of those bonds. CDS also allow particular credit risks to be hedged, as an entity can purchase protection from many sources of credit risk, much like an insurance policy. While total notional value related to CDS are enormous (estimated between $25–$50 trillion), the true exposure related to that notional value is approximately $2.5-$3.0 trillion. This amount would only be lost if the underlying assets lost their entire value (i.e., akin to all the cars insured by car insurance companies being totaled simultaneously; CDS insure bonds instead of cars), which is outside any reasonable scenario. Since many of these CDS provide protection against defaults of bonds in quality companies, true risk of loss related to CDS is considerably less.

=== Mortgage lending regulations ===
Mortgage lending standards declined during the boom and complex, risky mortgage offerings were made to consumers that arguably did not understand them. At the height of the bubble in 2005, the median down payment for first-time home buyers was 2%, with 43% of those buyers making no down payment whatsoever. An estimated one-third of adjustable rate mortgages originated between 2004 and 2006 had "teaser" rates below 4%, which then increased significantly after some initial period, as much as doubling the monthly payment.

==== Arguments for establishing minimum down payments and lending standards ====
Lending standards declined sharply before the financial crisis. There is strong evidence that lending standards generally loosen during prosperous times, and that permitting financial institutions to compete with each other for revenue and market share by lowering standards lead to a "race toward the bottom." There is also strong evidence that the expansion in mortgage lending including subprime lending, and more generally lending in lower income census tracts, was disproportionately fueled by lightly regulated non-bank independent mortgage lenders. There is also evidence that areas served predominantly by independent lenders saw sharper increases in foreclosure rates.

Warren Buffett stated in February 2009: "The present housing debacle should teach home buyers, lenders, brokers and government some simple lessons that will ensure stability in the future. Home purchases should involve an honest-to-God down payment of at least 10 percent and monthly payments that can be comfortably handled by the borrower's income. That income should be carefully verified."

China has down payment requirements that exceed 20%, with higher amounts for non-primary residences.

Economist Stan Leibowitz argued that the most important factor in foreclosures was the extent to which the homeowner has positive equity. Although only 12% of homes had negative equity, they constituted 47% of all foreclosures during the second half of 2008. He advocated "relatively high" minimum down payments and stronger underwriting standards. "If substantial down payments had been required, the housing price bubble would certainly have been smaller, if it occurred at all, and the incidence of negative equity would have been much smaller even as home prices fell. A further beneficial regulation would be a strengthening, or at least clarifying at a national level, of the recourse that mortgage lenders have if a borrower defaults. Many defaults could be mitigated if homeowners with financial resources know they can't just walk away."

A 2009 Republican congressional staff report cited government pressure as a cause of the crisis: "Washington must reexamine its politically expedient but irresponsible approach to encouraging higher levels of home ownership based on imprudently small down payments and too little emphasis on borrowers’ creditworthiness and ability to repay their loans."

The Fed implemented new rules for mortgage lenders in July 2008.

==== Arguments against establishing minimum down payments and lending standards ====
Higher lending standards may place downward pressure on economic growth and prevents those of lesser economic means from owning their own home.

=== Executive compensation ===
==== Arguments for regulating executive compensation ====
Economist Joseph Stiglitz argued: "We need first to correct incentives for executives, reducing the scope for conflicts of interest and improving shareholder information about dilution in share value as a result of stock options. We should mitigate the incentives for excessive risk-taking and the short-term focus that has so long prevailed, for instance, by requiring bonuses to be paid on the basis of, say, five-year returns, rather than annual returns."

The ratio of average CEO total direct compensation relative to that of the average worker increased from 29 times (1969) to 126 times (1992) and 275 times in 2007.

Bank CEO Jamie Dimon argued: "Rewards have to track real, sustained, risk-adjusted performance. Golden parachutes, special contracts, and unreasonable perks must disappear. There must be a relentless focus on risk management that starts at the top of the organization and permeates down to the entire firm. This should be business-as-usual, but at too many places, it wasn't."

President Obama has assigned Kenneth Feinberg as "Special Master" on executive pay, for firms that received government assistance, including several major banks and General Motors. He will review the pay packages proposed by these firms for their top executives.

==== Arguments against regulating executive compensation ====
The top executives of a business are primarily responsible for ensuring that the business is conducted in a profitable manner; this can make the difference between a viable business and a failure which must be liquidated. Very few people are willing and able to perform that kind of task. Thus it is reasonable for boards of directors of large corporations to pay very high salaries to top executives who can perform. To ensure performance, it is usual to link the compensation to measures of the business's success, e.g. by paying the executive mostly in stock or call options which are deferred (to give the stock market a chance to evaluate the executive's performance before he can cash in on it). When especially successful, the executive can expect to receive compensation exceeding the average of other executives in comparable positions.

Some say the opposition to such high compensation is largely based on envy – many people do not want to acknowledge that the work of another person could be worth hundreds of times more than their own work. Perhaps they resent the success of others. Critics say that if government regulates executive compensation, then it will be removing the main tool by which the owners of the business control their company – such controls would amount to de facto nationalization. Capable executives may move to unregulated or foreign companies.

=== Financial Products Safety Commission (FPSC) ===
The concept is that a government agency or commission would review new financial products, similar to how the U.S. Food and Drug Administration reviews new drugs. Products would be reviewed to ensure the risks could be "safe for consumption" and effectively communicated to investors or homeowners, depending on the product. Related legislation has been proposed in Congress.

==== Arguments for a FPSC ====
Economist Joseph Stiglitz has argued that a government agency should review new financial products. A financial products safety commission concept was included in the plan outlined by President Obama and his financial team.

==== Arguments against a FPSC ====
Critics may argue that such a commission would slow financial innovation, adversely impact Wall Street profit, or reduce credit availability if popular products (such as adjustable rate mortgages) are deemed inappropriate for consumers.

If people want U.S. government guaranteed safety, they can put their money in: cash, an FDIC insured account, or in U.S. Treasury securities. The whole point of other securities is to allow people to make their own judgment on risk instead of accepting the opinion of a financial dictator such as FPSC.

== See also ==
- Bailout
- Long-Term Capital Management
- Panic of 1907
- Shadow banking system
- Subprime mortgage crisis
- United States federal budget
