= Shadow banking system =

Non-banks that provide services similar to banks

The shadow banking system is the collection of non-bank financial intermediaries (NBFIs), or nondepository financial institutions (NDFIs) that legally provide services similar to traditional commercial banks but outside normal banking regulations. S&P Global estimates that, at end-2022, shadow banking held about $63 trillion in financial assets in major jurisdictions around the world, representing 78% of global GDP, up from $28 trillion and 68% of global GDP in 2009.

Examples of NBFIs include hedge funds, insurance firms, pawn shops, cashier's check issuers, check cashing locations, payday lending, currency exchanges, and microloan organizations. The phrase "shadow banking" is regarded by some as pejorative, and the term "market-based finance" has been proposed as an alternative.

US Federal Reserve Chair Ben Bernanke provided the following definition in November 2013:

Shadow banking, as usually defined, comprises a diverse set of institutions and markets that, collectively, carry out traditional banking functions—but do so outside, or in ways only loosely linked to, the traditional system of regulated depository institutions. Examples of important components of the shadow banking system include securitization vehicles, asset-backed commercial paper [ABCP] conduits, money market funds, markets for repurchase agreements, investment banks, and mortgage companies

Shadow banking has grown in importance to rival traditional depository banking, and was a factor in the subprime mortgage crisis of 2007–2008 and the global recession that followed.

== Overview ==
Paul McCulley of investment management firm PIMCO coined the term "shadow banking". Shadow banking is sometimes said to include entities such as hedge funds, money market funds, structured investment vehicles (SIV), "credit investment funds, exchange-traded funds, credit hedge funds, private equity funds, securities broker-dealers, credit insurance providers, securitization and finance companies." Still, the meaning and scope of shadow banking are disputed in academic literature. In China, shadow banking activities are closely associated with commercial banks, involving trust loans, entrusted loans, undiscounted bank acceptance bills, financial products, and interbank business. These activities are often regulated by a weak level and a limited coverage of supervision compared to highly regulated on-balance sheet activities.

According to Hervé Hannoun, deputy general manager of the Bank for International Settlements (BIS), investment banks and commercial banks may conduct much of their business in the shadow banking system (SBS) although most are not classified as SBS institutions themselves. At least one financial regulatory expert has said that regulated banking organizations are the largest shadow banks.

The core activities of investment banks are subject to regulation and monitoring by central banks and other government institutions – but it has been common practice for investment banks to conduct many of their transactions in ways that do not show up on their conventional balance sheet accounting and so are not visible to regulators or unsophisticated investors. For example, before the 2008 financial crisis, investment banks financed mortgages through off-balance-sheet (OBS) securitizations (e.g., asset-backed commercial paper programs) and hedged risk through off-balance sheet credit default swaps. Before the 2008 financial crisis, major investment banks were subject to considerably less stringent regulation than depository banks. In 2008, investment banks Morgan Stanley and Goldman Sachs became bank holding companies, Merrill Lynch and Bear Stearns were acquired by bank holding companies, and Lehman Brothers declared bankruptcy, essentially bringing the largest investment banks into the regulated depository sphere.

The volume of transactions in the shadow banking system grew dramatically after the year 2000. Its growth was checked by the 2008 financial crisis and for a short while it declined in size, both in the US and in the rest of the world. In 2007 the Financial Stability Board estimated the size of the SBS in the U.S. to be around $25 trillion, but by 2011 estimates indicated a decrease to $24 trillion. Globally, a study of the 11 largest national shadow banking systems found that they totaled $50 trillion in 2007, fell to $47 trillion in 2008, but by late 2011 had climbed to $51 trillion, just over their estimated size before the crisis. Overall, the worldwide SBS totaled about $60 (~$84.6 trillion in 2025) trillion as of late 2011. In November 2012 Bloomberg reported in a Financial Stability Board report an increase of the SBS to about $67 trillion. It is unclear to what extent various measures of the shadow banking system include activities of regulated banks, such as bank borrowing in the repo market and the issuance of bank-sponsored asset-backed commercial paper. Banks by far are the largest issuers of commercial paper in the United States, for example.

As of 2013, academic research has suggested that the true size of the shadow banking system may have been over $100 (~$138.00 in 2025) trillion in 2012. According to the Financial Stability Board the sector's size grew to $100 (~$131.00 in 2025) trillion in 2016.

The shadow activities of traditional banks grew rapidly in China during 2002-2018, but the United States and Canada still top the Average Shadow Banking Index by far. In 2024, the amount US financial institutions have loaned to shadow banks surpassed the $1 trillion mark.

== Entities that make up the system ==
Shadow institutions typically do not have banking licenses; they do not take deposits as a depository bank would and therefore are not subject to the same regulations. Complex legal entities comprising the system include hedge funds, structured investment vehicles (SIV), special purpose entity conduits (SPE), money market funds, repurchase agreement (repo) markets and other non-bank financial institutions. Many shadow banking entities are sponsored by banks or are affiliated with banks through their subsidiaries or parent bank holding companies. The inclusion of money market funds in the definition of shadow banking has been questioned in view of their relatively simple structure and the highly regulated and unleveraged nature of these entities, which are considered safer, more liquid, and more transparent than banks.

Shadow banking institutions are typically intermediaries between investors and borrowers. For example, an institutional investor like a pension fund may be willing to lend money, while a corporation may be searching for funds to borrow. The shadow banking institution will channel funds from the investor(s) to the corporation, profiting either from fees or from the difference in interest rates between what it pays the investor(s) and what it receives from the borrower.

Hervé Hannoun, Deputy General Manager of the Bank for International Settlements described the structure of this shadow banking system at the annual conference of the South East Asian Central Banks Research and Training Centre (SEACEN).

With the development of the originate-to-distribute model, banks and other lenders are able to extend loans to borrowers and then to package those loans into ABSs, CDOs, asset-backed commercial paper (ABCP) and structured investment vehicles (SIVs). These packaged securities are then sliced into various tranches, with the highly rated tranches going to the more risk-averse investors and the subordinate tranches going to the more adventurous investors.

— Hannoun, 2008

This sector was worth an estimated $60 trillion in 2010, compared to prior FSB estimates of $27 trillion in 2002. While the sector's assets declined during the 2008 financial crisis, they have since returned to their pre-crisis peak except in the United States where they have declined substantially.

A 2013 paper by Fiaschi et al. used a statistical analysis based on the deviation from the Zipf distribution of the sizes of the world's largest financial entities to infer that the size of the shadow banking system may have been over $100 (~$138 billion in 2025) trillion in 2012.

There are concerns that more business may move into the shadow banking system as regulators seek to bolster the financial system by making bank rules stricter.

=== Role in the financial system and modus operandi ===
Like regular banks, shadow banks provide credit and generally increase the liquidity of the financial sector. Yet unlike their more regulated competitors, they lack access to central bank funding or safety nets such as deposit insurance and debt guarantees. In contrast to traditional banks, shadow banks do not take deposits. Instead, they rely on short-term funding provided either by asset-backed commercial paper or by the repo market, in which borrowers in substance offer collateral as security against a cash loan, through the mechanism of selling the security to a lender and agreeing to repurchase it at an agreed time in the future for an agreed price. Money market funds do not rely on short-term funding; rather, they are investment pools that provide short-term funding by investing in short-term debt instruments issued by banks, corporations, state and local governments, and other borrowers. The shadow banking sector operates across the American, European, and Chinese financial sectors, and in perceived tax havens worldwide. Shadow banks can be involved in the provision of long-term loans like mortgages, facilitating credit across the financial system by matching investors and borrowers individually or by becoming part of a chain involving numerous entities, some of which may be mainstream banks. Due in part to their specialized structure, shadow banks can sometimes provide credit more cost-efficiently than traditional banks. A headline study by the International Monetary Fund defines the two key functions of the shadow banking system as securitization – to create safe assets, and collateral intermediation – to help reduce counterparty risks and facilitate secured transactions. In the US, before the 2008 financial crisis, the shadow banking system had overtaken the regular banking system in supplying loans to various types of borrower; including businesses, home and car buyers, students and credit users. As they are often less risk averse than regular banks, entities from the shadow banking system will sometimes provide loans to borrowers who might otherwise be refused credit. Money market funds are considered more risk averse than regular banks and thus lack this risk characteristic.

=== Risks associated with shadow banking ===
Leverage (the means by which banks multiply and spread risk) is considered to be a key risk feature of shadow banks, as well as traditional banks. Money market funds are completely unleveraged and thus do not have this risk characteristic. Shadow banking can threaten financial stability in countries where shadow banking is prevalent.

=== Recent attempts to regulate the shadow banking system ===
The recommendations for G20 leaders on regulating shadow banks were due to be finalised by the end of 2012. The United States and the European Union are already considering rules to increase regulation of areas like securitisation and money market funds, although the need for money market fund reforms has been questioned in the United States in light of reforms adopted by the Securities and Exchange Commission in 2010. The International Monetary Fund suggested that the two policy priorities should be to reduce spillovers from the shadow banking system to the main banking system and to reduce procyclicality and systemic risk within the shadow banking system itself.

In August 2013, the Financial Stability Board (FSB) published recommendations to strengthen the regulation of the shadow banking system, covering money market funds, securitization, securities lending and repurchase agreements, and risks arising from links between banks and non-bank financial institutions. The G20 leaders meeting in Russia in September 2013, endorsed the new Financial Stability Board (FSB) global regulations for the shadow banking systems which will come into effect by 2015.Following the market turmoil of March 2020, the FSB developed further policies to address vulnerabilities in non-bank financial intermediation, including liquidity mismatches and excessive leverage. However, its January 2023 progress report found that implementation remained incomplete in several areas, particularly securities financing transactions and the regulation of non-bank financial entities.

According to the FSB's December 2025 report, global non-bank financial intermediation assets grew by 9.4% in 2024, reaching US$256.8 trillion, equivalent to 51% of total global financial assets. The report also found that assets in the sector considered most likely to pose bank-like financial stability risks increased by 12.7% to US$76.3 trillion. In July 2025, the FSB stated that its main policy-development work was largely complete and that its priorities were shifting towards monitoring implementation, improving data availability and assessing emerging vulnerabilities, including risks associated with private credit.

== Importance ==
Many "shadow bank"-like institutions and vehicles have emerged in American and European markets, between the years 2000 and 2008, and have come to play an important role in providing credit across the global financial system.

In a June 2008 speech, Timothy Geithner, then president and CEO of the Federal Reserve Bank of New York, described the growing importance of what he called the "non-bank financial system": "In early 2007, asset-backed commercial paper conduits, in structured investment vehicles, in auction-rate preferred securities, tender option bonds and variable rate demand notes, had a combined asset size of roughly $2.2 trillion. Assets financed overnight in triparty repo grew to $2.5 trillion. Assets held in hedge funds grew to roughly $1.8 trillion. The combined balance sheets of the then five major investment banks totaled $4 trillion. In comparison, the total assets of the top five bank holding companies in the United States at that point were just over $6 trillion, and total assets of the entire banking system were about $10 trillion."

In 2016, Benoît Cœuré (ECB executive board member) stated that controlling shadow banking should be the focus to avoid a future financial crisis, since the banks' leverage had been lowered.

S&P Global estimates that, at end-2022, shadow banking held about $63 trillion in financial assets in major global jurisdictions, representing 78% of global GDP, up from $28 trillion and 68% of global GDP in 2009.

From 2010 to 2025, loans to non-depository financial institutions grew from $56.3 billion to over $1.47 trillion, reflecting sector loans growth of 39 percent in mortgages; 112 percent in commercial and industrial lending, 50 percent in consumer loans grew; and 54 percent in farm loans.

== Risks or vulnerability ==
Securitization markets were impaired during the crisis.

Shadow institutions are not subject to the same prudential regulations as depository banks, so that they do not have to keep as high financial reserves relative to their market exposure. Thus they can have a very high level of financial leverage, with a high ratio of debt relative to the liquid assets available to pay immediate claims. High leverage magnifies profits during boom periods and losses during downturns. This high leverage will also not be readily apparent to investors, and shadow institutions may therefore be able to create the appearance of superior performance during boom times by simply taking greater pro-cyclical risks. Money market funds have zero leverage and thus do not pose this risk feature of shadow banks.

Shadow institutions like SIVs and conduits, typically sponsored and guaranteed by commercial banks, borrowed from investors in short-term, liquid markets (such as the money market and commercial paper markets), so that they would have to repay and borrow again from these investors at frequent intervals. On the other hand, they used the funds to lend to corporations or to invest in longer-term, less liquid (i.e. harder to sell) assets. In many cases, the long-term assets purchased were mortgage-backed securities, sometimes called "toxic assets" or "legacy assets" in the press. These assets declined significantly in value as housing prices declined and foreclosures increased during 2007–2009.

In the case of investment banks, this reliance on short-term financing required them to return frequently to investors in the capital markets to refinance their operations. When the housing market began to deteriorate and their ability to obtain funds from investors through investments such as mortgage-backed securities declined, these investment banks could not refinance themselves. Investor refusal or inability to provide funds via the short-term markets was a primary cause of the failure of Bear Stearns and Lehman Brothers during 2008.

From a technical standpoint, these institutions are subject to market risk, credit risk and especially liquidity risk, since their liabilities are short term while their assets are more long term and illiquid. This creates a problem, as they are not depositary institutions and do not have direct or indirect access to the support of their central bank in its role as lender of last resort. Therefore, during periods of market illiquidity, they could go bankrupt if unable to refinance their short-term liabilities. They were also highly leveraged. This meant that disruptions in credit markets would make them subject to rapid deleveraging, meaning they would have to pay off their debts by selling their long-term assets. A sell off of assets could cause further price declines of those assets and further losses and selloffs. In contrast to investment banks, money market funds do not go bankrupt—they distribute their assets (which are mainly short-term) pro rata to shareholders if their net asset value falls below $.9995 per share. Only two funds ever have failed to pay investors $1.00 per share. The Reserve Primary Fund paid $.99 per share to its shareholders and another fund paid its shareholders $.96 per share in 1994.

The securitization markets frequently tapped by the shadow banking system started to close down in the spring of 2007, with the first failure of auction-rate offerings to attract bids. As excesses associated with the U.S. housing bubble became widely understood and borrower default rates rose, residential mortgage-backed securities (RMBS) deflated. Tranched collateralized debt obligations (CDOs) lost value as default rates increased beyond the levels projected by their associated agency credit ratings. Commercial mortgage-backed securities suffered from association and from a general decline in economic activity, and the entire complex nearly shut down in the fall of 2008. More than a third of the private credit markets thus became unavailable as a source of funds. In February 2009, Ben Bernanke stated that securitization markets remained effectively shut, with the exception of conforming mortgages, which could be sold to Fannie Mae and Freddie Mac.

U.S. Treasury Secretary Timothy Geithner has stated that the "combined effect of these factors was a financial system vulnerable to self-reinforcing asset price and credit cycles."

In January 2012, the global Financial Stability Board announced its intention to further regulate the shadow banking system, in the interests of the real economy.

== History and origin of the term ==
The term "shadow banking system" is attributed to Paul McCulley of PIMCO, who coined it at Federal Reserve Bank of Kansas City's Economic Symposium in Jackson Hole, Wyoming in 2007 where he defined it as "the whole alphabet soup of levered up non-bank investment conduits, vehicles, and structures." McCulley identified the birth of the shadow banking system with the development of money market funds in the 1970s – money market accounts function largely as bank deposits, but money market funds are not regulated as banks.

The concept of hidden high priority debt dates back at least 400 years to Twyne's Case and the Statute of Bankrupts (1542) in the UK, and to Clow v. Woods in the U.S. These legal cases led to the development of modern fraudulent transfer law.

The concept of credit growth by unregulated institutions, though not the term "shadow banking system", dates at least to 1935, when Friedrich Hayek stated:

There can be no doubt that besides the regular types of the circulating medium, such as coin, notes and bank deposits, which are generally recognised to be money or currency, and the quantity of which is regulated by some central authority or can at least be imagined to be so regulated, there exist still other forms of media of exchange which occasionally or permanently do the service of money.... The characteristic peculiarity of these forms of credit is that they spring up without being subject to any central control, but once they have come into existence their convertibility into other forms of money must be possible if a collapse of credit is to be avoided.

The full extent of the shadow banking system was not widely recognised until work was published in 2010 by Manmohan Singh and James Aitken of the International Monetary Fund, showing that when the role of rehypothecation was considered, in the U.S. the SBS had grown to over $10 trillion, about twice as much as previous estimates.

=== Examples ===
During 1998, the highly leveraged and unregulated hedge fund Long-Term Capital Management failed and was bailed out by several major banks at the request of the government, which was concerned about possible damage to the broader financial system.

Structured investment vehicles (SIVs) first came to public attention at the time of the Enron scandal. Since then, their use has become widespread in the financial world. In the years leading up to the crisis, the top four U.S. depository banks moved an estimated $5.2 trillion in assets and liabilities off their balance sheets into special purpose vehicles (SPEs) or similar entities. This enabled them to bypass regulatory requirements for minimum capital adequacy ratios, thereby increasing leverage and profits during the boom but increasing losses during the crisis. New accounting guidance was planned to require them to put some of these assets back onto their books during 2009, with the effect of reducing their capital ratios. One news agency estimated the amount of assets to be transferred at between $500 billion and $1 trillion. This transfer was considered as part of the stress tests performed by the government during 2009.

== Credit derivatives facilitate extension of credit ==
The shadow banking system also conducts an enormous amount of trading activity in the over-the-counter (OTC) derivatives market, which grew rapidly in the decade up to the 2008 financial crisis, reaching over US$650 trillion in notional contracts traded. This rapid growth mainly arose from credit derivatives. In particular these included:

- interest rate obligations derived from bundles of mortgage securities
- collateralised debt obligations (CDO)
- credit default swaps (CDS), a form of insurance against the default risk inherent in the assets underlying a CDO; and
- a variety of customized innovations on the CDO model, collectively known as synthetic CDOs

The market in CDS, for example, was insignificant in 2004 but rose to over $60 trillion in a few years. Because credit default swaps were not regulated as insurance contracts, companies selling them were not required to maintain sufficient capital reserves to pay potential claims. Demands for settlement of hundreds of billions of dollars of credit default swaps contracts issued by AIG, the largest insurance company in the world, led to its financial collapse. Despite the prevalence and volume of this activity, it attracted little outside attention before 2007, and much of it was off the balance sheets of the contracting parties' affiliated banks. The uncertainty this created among counterparties contributed to the deterioration of credit conditions.

Since then the shadow banking system has been blamed for aggravating the subprime mortgage crisis and helping to transform it into a global credit crunch.

=== Contribution to the 2008 financial crisis ===
The shadow banking system has been implicated as significantly contributing to the 2008 financial crisis. In a June 2008 speech, U.S. Treasury Secretary Timothy Geithner, then President and CEO of the New York Federal Reserve Bank, placed significant blame for the freezing of credit markets on a "run" on the entities in the shadow banking system by their counterparties. The rapid increase of the dependency of bank and non-bank financial institutions on the use of these off-balance sheet entities to fund investment strategies had made them critical to the credit markets underpinning the financial system as a whole, despite their existence in the shadows, outside of the regulatory controls governing commercial banking activity. Furthermore, these entities were vulnerable because they borrowed short-term in liquid markets to purchase long-term, illiquid and risky assets. This meant that disruptions in credit markets would make them subject to rapid deleveraging, selling their long-term assets at depressed prices.

Economist Paul Krugman described the run on the shadow banking system as the "core of what happened" to cause the crisis. "As the shadow banking system expanded to rival or even surpass conventional banking in importance, politicians and government officials should have realized that they were re-creating the kind of financial vulnerability that made the Great Depression possible—and they should have responded by extending regulations and the financial safety net to cover these new institutions. Influential figures should have proclaimed a simple rule: anything that does what a bank does, anything that has to be rescued in crises the way banks are, should be regulated like a bank." He referred to this lack of controls as "malign neglect."

One former banking regulator has said that regulated banking organizations are the largest shadow banks and that shadow banking activities within the regulated banking system were responsible for the severity of the 2008 financial crisis.

=== Contribution to the Chinese property sector crisis (2020–present) ===
The Chinese shadow banks, such as Sichuan Trust, have been greatly affected by the Chinese property sector crisis (2020–present) due to over lending and a crackdown on regulations.

== See also ==
- Irish Section 110 Special Purpose Vehicle (SPV)
- Long-Term Capital Management
- Private credit
- Recession
- Shadow government (conspiracy theory)
- Structured investment vehicle
- Subprime crisis background information
- Subprime mortgage crisis
- Subprime mortgage crisis solutions debate
