= Sichuan Trust =

Sichuan Trust is a non-bank financial institution, based in China. It is headquartered in the southwest city of Chengdu. It is one of the shadow banks in China.

== Current Issues ==
In May 2020, Sichuan Trust disclosed about a 20 billion yuan deficit. Later, the deficit was estimated to be as much as 30 billion yuan.

Sichuan Trust's financial difficulty started when the Chinese government began restricting new sales of trust products in 2020, which caused a loss of new incoming revenue from new investors so Sichuan Trust could not pay its debts.

According to Diana Choyleva, chief economist at Enodo Economics, Sichuan Trust was the earliest to fail during the Chinese economic configuration.

In 2021, police arrested Liu Canglong, Sichuan Trust's majority shareholder, who was a mining and real estate tycoon and was once the richest man in Sichuan province for embezzling trust funds.

In January, several investors contacted China's National Administration of Financial Regulation to find out what assets were underlying the investments but were told that the information was a "state secret".
