= Paul McCulley =

American economist

- Born: March 13, 1957 (age 69)

Academic background
- Education: Columbia Business School (M.B.A.); Grinnell College (B.A.)
- Influences: John Maynard Keynes; Hyman Minsky; William H. Gross

Academic work
- Discipline: Financial economics
- School or tradition: Post-Keynesian economics
- Institutions: PIMCO

Paul Allen McCulley (born March 13, 1957) is an American economist and former managing director at PIMCO. He coined the terms "Minsky moment" and "shadow banking system", which became famous during the 2008 financial crisis. He is currently a senior fellow at Cornell Law School and an adjunct professor at Georgetown McDonough School of Business.

He was also a generalist portfolio manager and member of the investment committee in the Pimco Newport Beach office. In addition, he headed PIMCO's short-term bond desk, led PIMCO’s cyclical economic forums and was author of the monthly research publication, Global Central Bank Focus. Prior to joining PIMCO in 1999, he was chief economist for the Americas at UBS Warburg. During 1996–98, he was named to six seats on the Institutional Investor All-America fixed-income research team. He has 25 years of investment experience and holds an M.B.A. from Columbia Business School. He received his undergraduate degree from Grinnell College.

He retired from PIMCO in December 2010 and joined the Global Interdependence Center thinktank.

McCulley adheres to Keynesian economics, and was particularly influenced by Hyman Minsky.

He is a regular guest of CNBC and Bloomberg Television providing investment commentary.

== Quotes ==
- "We believe that Mr. Greenspan should quit giving away puts on the equity market."
- "Thus, we are willing to say stocks are irrationally exuberant, notably growth stocks, and, in particular, technology stocks."
- "There is room for the Fed to create a bubble in housing prices, if necessary, to sustain American hedonism. And I think the Fed has the will to do so, even though political correctness would demand that Mr. Greenspan deny any such thing."
- "Debt deflation is a beast of burden that capitalism cannot bear alone."
- "Macroeconomic life after bubbles is not a self-correcting process of renewal, but a self-feeding process of debt deflation — to wit, it’s a Minsky Moment."
- "Loosely defined, a Shadow Bank is a levered-up financial intermediary whose liabilities are broadly perceived as of similar money-goodness and liquidity as conventional bank deposits. These liabilities could be shares of money market mutual funds; or the commercial paper of Finance Companies, Conduits and Structured Investment Vehicles; or the repo borrowings of stand-alone Investment Banks and Hedge Funds; or the senior tranches of Collateralized Debt Obligations; or a host of other similar funding instruments."
