= Depository bank =

Specialist bank facilitating investment via depositary receipt services

A depository bank (U.S. usage) or depositary bank (predominantly EU usage) is a specialist financial entity which, depending on jurisdiction, facilitates investment in securities markets.

== Depository banks in the United States ==
In the United States, a depository is a bank organized in the US which provides all the stock transfer and agency services in connection with a depositary receipt program. This function includes arranging for a custodian to accept deposits of ordinary shares, issuing the negotiable receipts which back up the shares, maintaining the register of holders to reflect all transfers and exchanges, and distributing dividends in U.S. dollars.

== Depositary banks in the European Union ==
In the EU, a depositary is a financial institution which provides fiduciary/custodian services to Investment Funds authorised to trade in any EU jurisdiction as a UCITS or Alternative Investment Fund. Both the UCITS (2009/65/EC) Directive and AIFMD (2011/61/EU) Directives require that authorised investment funds have a depositary appointed to the fund to safekeep the assets of the fund (whether by taking them into custody, or record-keeping and verifying title of them) and oversee the affairs of the fund to ensure that it complies with obligations outlined in relevant laws and the fund's constitutional documents. Depositaries have been subject to significantly increased regulation in the EU in recent years and the proposed “UCITS V” directive proposes to continue this trend by imposing a “strict” standard of depositary liability for the loss of fund assets, other than in certain circumstances.
