= Peter Fitzhugh Brown =

American computer scientist

Peter Fitzhugh Brown (born February 2, 1955) is the CEO of the American hedge fund Renaissance Technologies.

== Personal life and education ==
Brown is a son of Henry B. R. Brown, who invented the world's first money market fund, the Reserve Fund. Brown's great-grandfather was United States federal judge Addison Brown, who was also a botanist and a founder of the New York Botanical Garden. He is also a descendent of Virginia statesman Richard Henry Lee, whose June 1776 resolution led to the United States Declaration of Independence.

Brown graduated from Harvard University with a BA in mathematics. He later earned a PhD in computer science from Carnegie Mellon University under Geoffrey Hinton.

Brown married Margaret Hamburg on May 23, 1992, who would later serve as the head of the Food and Drug Administration under the Obama Administration. Together they have two children. Their family foundation, Quetzal Trust, has over $380 million in assets as of 2020.

== Career ==
After graduating from Harvard, Brown joined a team at Exxon Office Systems that was working on computer systems to transcribe spoken language into computer text. In 1984 he joined the IBM speech group, working on computer software to transcribe spoken text. The group, led by Frederick Jelinek, included Robert Mercer and several other mathematicians, statisticians, and scientists.

To them, language could be modeled like a game of chance. At any point in a sentence, there exists a certain probability of what might come next, which can be estimated based on past, common usage. ... each step along the way is random, yet dependent on the previous step—a hidden Markov model. A speech-recognition system's job was to take a set of observed sounds, crunch the probabilities, and make the best possible guess about the "hidden" sequences of words that could have generated these sounds. To do that, the IBM researchers employed the Baum-Welch algorithm—codeveloped by Jim Simons's early trading partner Lenny Baum—to zero in on the various language probabilities. Rather than manually programming in static knowledge about how the language worked, they created a program that learned from data.

Brown was the lead author in the IBM alignment models. They demonstrated a spellchecker to the IBM management using a statistical system similar to the IBM alignment models. Brown unsuccessfully urged IBM management to use the speech group's research to develop and sell new products, such as an automated service for evaluation of financial credit. He successfully convinced Abe Peled, a high-level executive in IBM's Research Division, to hire the Carnegie Mellon research team that was programming a computer to play chess. The team, working for IBM, developed Deep Blue, which defeated Garry Kasparov in a 1997 chess match.

Around 1993, he suggested to IBM that the statistical method could be applied to finance, such as managing the $28 billion pension fund of IBM, but the suggestion was not taken up. Jim Simons offered to double Peter Brown's and Robert Mercer's IBM salaries, so they went to work for Renaissance Technologies in 1993. Brown and Mercer were responsible for hiring David Magerman in 1995. In 1995 Brown and Mercer incorporated all of the trading signals and portfolio requirements of Renaissance Technologies into a monolithic, new, and improved trading system. Soon afterward, they were promoted to senior managers and partners with percentages of the profits of Renaissance Technologies. Magerman found and fixed two serious software bugs in Brown and Mercer's trading system. In 1997 Simons gave a 10% equity stake to Henry Laufer and, later, gave sizable equity stakes to Brown, Mercer, and others. Simons thus reduced his equity stake to very slightly over 50%. As Jim Simons became more confident, he moved the firm into a new headquarters compound with a gym, lighted tennis courts, a library with a fireplace, and a large auditorium, where biweekly seminars were held.

Intense and energetic, Brown hustled from meeting to meeting, riding a unicycle through the halls and almost running over colleagues. Brown worked much of the night on a computer near the Murphy bed in his office, grabbing a nap when he tired.

In 2003 Simons announced that Brown and Mercer would become executive vice-presidents of the entire firm, co-managing with Simons himself. In 2010 Simons made Brown and Mercer co-CEOS and retired. In November 2017, Mercer announced that he would resign from Renaissance Technologies. Since Mercer's resignation, Brown has been the sole CEO.

== White's Ferry controversy ==
Brown and his sisters, Elizabeth Devlin and Harriet Dickerson, own Rockland Farm LLC in Loudoun County, Virginia, which has been in the Rust/Brown family for over 200 years.

A narrow portion of the property along the Potomac River has long been used as the Virginia-side landing of White's Ferry, an important commuting link between Loudoun County and Montgomery County in Maryland. After unauthorized expansion of the landing including a concrete retaining wall was built on the property by the operators of White's Ferry following damage from a flood, Rockland Farm LLC sued, stating the 1952 license had been violated. Rockland Farm LLC won its case in November 2020 and White's Ferry ceased operations following a flood that snapped the cable used by the ferry to cross the river and failed negotiations to keep service operating.

In 2022, it was reported that negotiations to reopen the ferry were continuing with the new owners of the ferry service. Rockland Farm LLC has offered to purchase the Maryland landing for more than the owner paid for it to get the ferry re-opened. It has also asked to be paid an inflation-adjusted per car fee of 50 cents as well as offering to go to last-best-offer binding arbitration; however, the current owners have rejected all offers. In turn, Rockland Farm LLC has rejected all proposals to sell the Virginia landing to the owners of the ferry.
