= Nat Simons =

American businessman

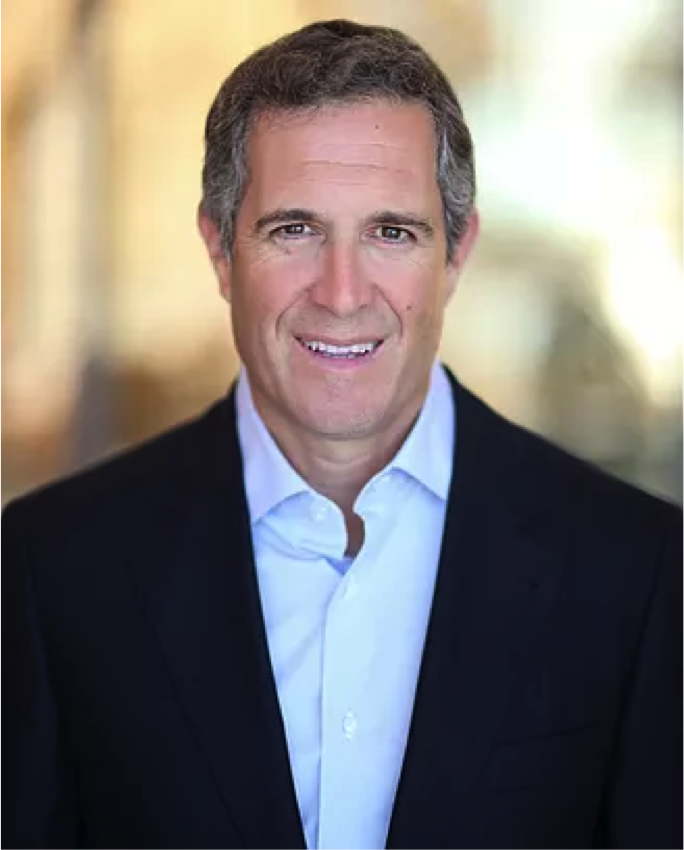
- Born: Nathaniel Simons; 1966 (age 59–60)
- Education: University of California, Berkeley
- Occupation: Investment manager
- Spouse: Laura Baxter-Simons
- Children: 2
- Parent(s): Jim Simons, Barbara Simons
- Relatives: Marvin R. Baxter (father-in-law)

Nathaniel Simons (born 1966) is an American billionaire hedge fund manager and philanthropist. He is the founder of Meritage Group, an investment management firm managing over $12 billion in assets, co-founder of Prelude Ventures, a clean tech investment fund, and is the former co-chair of Renaissance Technologies, one of the largest hedge funds in the world.

He is the son of the founder of Renaissance Technologies, Jim Simons.

Simons is also the co-founder and a director of the Sea Change Foundation, which focuses on climate change and clean energy policy.

== Early life ==
The son of James Simons, a mathematician and the founder of Renaissance Technologies, and Barbara Simons née Bluestein, a computer scientist and former president of the Association for Computing Machinery (ACM), he attended the University of California, Berkeley. There, he earned a bachelor's degree in economics in 1989, followed by a master's degree in mathematics in 1994.

== Career ==
Simons began his career at Cylink Corp in 1989. Since 1994, Simons has been a principal at Renaissance Technologies. At Renaissance, Simons worked as a data analyst from 1994 to 1995, then as a futures trader from 1995 to 1997. In 1997, he began the Meritage family of funds, which was spun off from Renaissance. Simons served as vice chair at Renaissance from 2006 to 2020 and is senior managing director and chair of Meritage Group.

In 2009, Simons co-founded Prelude Ventures, a clean-technology venture fund. In that same year, he was listed #20 on Fortune's World's Top 25 Eco-Innovators. In 2015, Simons and his wife, Laura Baxter-Simons, joined the Breakthrough Energy Coalition. The coalition is a partnership of individuals who have pledged to invest in new energy technologies.

== Philanthropy ==
In 2006, Simons co-founded Sea Change Foundation, focused on climate change and clean energy policy. In 2009, Simons spoke along with Bill Clinton and Al Gore at the National Clean Energy Project roundtable. In discussing philanthropy's role in combating climate change, Simons stated:

I think the role of philanthropy is more than anything to just facilitate the process. There are many different stakeholders, and they all have to be brought together. The grid is perhaps the best example we can think of where there are many disparate interests. And to get it done quickly is going to take a herculean effort from all sides.

Simons has been on the board of the Exploratorium and Berkeley's board of visitors.

He and his family are long-time benefactors of their alma mater, Berkeley, including SERC and the Berkeley Tsinghua Joint Research Center on Energy and Climate Change. In May 2017, Simons and his spouse signed The Giving Pledge, a foundation created by Bill Gates where individuals pledge to donate the majority of their wealth. Laura Baxter-Simons is a member of the advisory board for the College of Letters & Science at Berkeley and of the Steering Committee for Berkeley's "Light the Way" campaign.

== Personal life and family ==
Simons and Laura Baxter-Simons have two children. Baxter-Simons, who holds degrees in economics, German, and German literature from Berkeley, is the daughter of former California Supreme Court Justice Marvin Baxter and is an attorney, having received her JD from Stanford. Baxter-Simons serves as the general counsel and chief compliance officer at Meritage Group.
