= Lifestyling =

Pension investment de-risking strategy

Lifestyling is an investment approach used in some pension schemes and retirement investment products in which the asset allocation changes automatically as a saver approaches a target retirement age. It is intended to reduce exposure to investment volatility near retirement, often by moving part of the portfolio from equities to lower-risk assets such as bonds or cash.

In the United Kingdom, lifestyle strategies are commonly incorporated into the default investment arrangements of workplace defined contribution pensions. The Pensions Regulator and Financial Conduct Authority describe the aim as setting an investment mix at the target retirement date that is consistent with how savers are expected to use their pension savings, which can include buying an annuity or remaining invested using income drawdown.

Lifestyling can be implemented in different ways and relies on assumptions about the retirement date and how benefits will be taken, which may not match every saver. It is related to target date funds, which also shift their investment mix over time along a pre-set "glide path".

== Concept ==
In workplace and personal pensions, lifestyling describes a pre-set schedule for changing the asset allocation of a member's savings as they approach a chosen retirement date. The schedule is typically based on age or years to retirement and reduces exposure to higher-volatility assets such as equities in favour of assets that are intended to be more stable, such as bonds or cash.

Lifestyle strategies can be implemented by switching members between named funds or by changing the mix of assets held within a multi-asset fund. UK regulators (The Pensions Regulator and Financial Conduct Authority) have described lifestyling as a way of moving savers towards an asset mix that is expected to fit how they will take benefits at retirement, although the design choices and assumptions vary between schemes and providers.

== Implementation ==
A lifestyle strategy sets a target retirement date and a schedule for moving from "growth" assets to assets intended to be more stable as that date approaches. The Pensions Regulator has noted that, in workplace defined contribution defaults, the shift towards a higher allocation to bonds may begin between about five and 15 years before retirement. Illustrations in its trustee training materials show designs in which bonds are introduced around a decade before retirement, with cash added closer to retirement, although the timing and destination asset mix vary between schemes and products.

Providers and trustees can implement lifestyling by switching members between underlying funds over time or by changing the asset mix within a fund that has internal rebalancing rules. Historically, many lifestyle strategies were designed to target an asset mix at the nominated retirement date that broadly matched taking tax-free cash and buying an annuity, and regulators have highlighted that design assumptions may need review where savers use different retirement options.

In UK trust-based occupational defined contribution schemes, trustees are required to set out a default investment strategy and review both the strategy and its performance at least every three years and after significant changes, such as to investment policy or the demographic profile of members using the default.

== Assumptions and variants ==
A lifestyle strategy is built around assumptions about when a saver will retire and how they are expected to take benefits at or around that date. In UK pensions, this can include assumptions about whether savings will be used to buy an annuity or kept invested for income drawdown, and these assumptions influence the destination asset mix that the strategy aims to reach by the target retirement date.

Schemes and providers may offer more than one lifestyle "pathway" linked to different expected retirement choices, or allow members to select a target retirement date that determines the pace of switching. UK regulators and policy analysts have noted that many lifestyle designs were developed when annuity purchase was more common, and that strategies intended for annuity purchase may not be appropriate where members are more likely to use drawdown or remain invested after retirement.

The approach can be sensitive to members changing their planned retirement date or accessing benefits in stages, which can result in switching that is earlier or later than intended for their circumstances. UK regulators have emphasised the importance of reviewing default strategy design and ensuring that communications and governance keep pace with how members are using pensions in practice.

== Criticism and limitations ==
Lifestyle strategies depend on assumptions about a member's retirement date and how they will take benefits, and those assumptions may not match what the member eventually does. UK regulators have raised concerns where lifestyling designs and communications did not adequately reflect likely retirement behaviour or where strategies were not kept under review as member needs and retirement options changed.

Reducing exposure to equities does not remove investment risk, and the choice of "lower risk" assets can introduce different risks that matter near retirement, including sensitivity to interest rates for bond-heavy allocations and the risk that cash-heavy allocations may not keep pace with inflation. Policy and regulatory guidance has emphasised that the outcomes of life-cycle approaches depend on design choices, including the speed of switching and the asset mix reached at the target date, which can vary significantly between products and schemes.

The Pensions Regulator has therefore emphasised governance and ongoing monitoring, including periodic reviews of default investment strategy design and performance and clear member communications about the intended target outcome and key assumptions.

== See also ==
- Liability-driven investment strategy
- Target date fund
