= Stable value fund =

Type of investment

A stable value fund is a type of investment available in 401(k) plans and other defined contribution plans as well as some 529 or tuition assistance plans. Stable value funds are often made available in these plans under a name that intends to describe the nature of the fund (such as capital preservation fund, fixed-interest fund, capital accumulation fund, principal protection fund, guaranteed fund, preservation fund, or income fund among others). They offer principal preservation, predictable returns, and a rate higher than similar options without proportionately increasing risk. The funds are structured in various ways, but in general they are composed of high quality, diversified fixed income portfolios that are protected against interest rate volatility by contracts from banks and insurance companies. For example, a stable value fund may hold highly rated government or corporate debt, asset-backed securities, residential and commercial mortgage-backed securities, and cash equivalents. Stable value funds are designed to preserve principal while providing steady, positive returns, and are considered one of the lowest risk investment options offered in 401(k) plans. Stable value funds have recently been returning an annualized average of 2.72% as of October 2014, higher than the 0.08% offered by money-market funds, and are offered in 165,000 retirement plans.

== Explanation ==
The investment objective of stable value funds is to provide capital preservation and predictable, steady returns. During the 2008 financial crisis, stable value funds were one of the few 401(k) investments that produced a positive return; stable value fund returns generally ranged between 3 and 5 percent for 2008.

Stable value funds generally invest in high credit rating bonds, typically AAA and AA, and then “wrap” them with contracts issued by banks and insurance companies that help smooth out the returns of the underlying portfolio of bonds. The wrap protects the fund in times of market volatility by smoothing out the losses and gains of the underlying investments over the duration of the fund. Another popular stable value structure is the general account product which provides a fixed rate of return for a stated period backed by the full faith and credit of the insurance company and transfers investment risks to the insurer as well. Stable value funds have a level of risk and stability similar to that of money market funds but generate higher returns.

Stable value funds are offered in approximately half of all 401(k) plans and some 529 tuition savings plans. Individuals have invested $770 billion in stable value funds through 165,000 defined contribution plans, which include 457, 403(b) and 401(k) plans as of June 2015.

== History ==
Stable value funds have been around since the inception of US defined contribution plans in the 1970s. Initially they consisted of guaranteed investment contracts, or GICs, which were backed solely by the issuer's claims-paying ability. GICs are issued by insurance companies and guarantee principal invested plus a periodically-reset interest rate for a specific duration. The primary concern plan sponsors had in regards to GICs was the lack of flexibility and ownership of assets, which was partly remedied with the creation of separate account GICs. Separate account GICs hold the assets of the plan in a separate account that cannot be used to settle claims against the insurer's general account. Then in mid-1988 a broader array of stable value funds began to be offered, including the now common synthetic GIC. A synthetic GIC is a contract for a separately managed portfolio of fixed securities that is owned by the plan, often referred to as a wrap because it wraps the portfolio and protects it against rate fluctuations. In 2007, the Department of Labor excluded stable-value funds from their list of qualified default investment alternatives (QDIAs), but allowed retirement plans using stable-value funds to "grandfather" their choice.

Today, the most commonly used type of contract in stable value funds is the synthetic GIC and from 1999 through 2014 stable value funds averaged a total return of 4.35% with a standard deviation of 1.23%. For money-market funds, the average total return was 1.93% with a standard deviation of 2.08%; and for intermediate-term bonds, 4.82% and 3.15%.

== Types of stable value funds ==
Stable value funds are structured in one of three ways: as a separately managed account, which is a stable value fund managed for one specific 401(k) plan; as a commingled fund, which pools together assets from many 401(k) plans and offers the benefits of diversification and economies of scale for smaller plans; or as a guaranteed insurance company account, which issues a group annuity contract directly to the plan.

Regardless of how stable value funds are structured, they are a diversified portfolio of fixed income securities that are insulated from interest rate movements by contracts from banks and insurance companies. How this contract protection is delivered depends on the type of stable value fund investment purchased and is provided through one or more of the following investment instruments:

=== Guaranteed Investment Contract (GIC)/General Account Contract ===
A group annuity contract with an insurance company that provides principal preservation and a specified rate of return over a set period of time, regardless of the performance of the underlying invested assets. The invested assets are owned by the insurance company and held within the insurer's general account.

=== Separate Account Contract ===
A contract with an insurance company that provides principal preservation and a specified rate of return over a set period of time on an account that holds a combination of fixed income securities. Separate accounts may provide either a fixed, indexed, or periodic rate of return based on the performance of the underlying assets. The assets are owned by the insurance company and are set aside in a separate account solely for the benefit of the specific contract holder or retirement plan.

=== Synthetic GIC ===
A contract with a bank or insurance company (commonly referred to as a wrap) that guarantees a rate of return for a portfolio of assets held in an external trust. The rate of return is reset periodically and is based on the actual performance of the underlying assets. The assets are owned by the participating plan or plans.

The typical stable value fund will diversify contract protection by investing in more than one instrument type and/or with more than one insurance company or bank. Stable value portfolio managers also limit risk by holding a mix of maturities, such as intermediate-term bonds and short-term bonds generally with credit ratings of AAA or AA.

== Risks ==
Stable value funds are considered one of the lowest risk investments offered in 401(k) plans; however, like any investment, they do have some risks, which include:

=== Interest Rate Lag ===
In rapidly changing rate environments the returns on stable value funds may change more slowly than those of the marketplace, including similar investments such as money market funds. However, stable value funds still tend to outperform investments such as money market funds over time.

=== Liquidity Risk ===
To prevent yield chasing, stable value funds generally contain “equity wash rules” limiting transfers to competing investments such as a money market fund or short-term bond fund. Generally a participant must first place money in a stock or equity fund for at least 90 days, but cash withdrawals have no waiting periods.

=== Contract Issuer/Guarantor Risk ===
Contract issuers can become less financially stable. This risk is most pronounced in funds with non-synthetic GICs because a single guarantor is backing the fund with the full faith and credit of the company. Most stable value funds mitigate this risk by purchasing contracts from multiple issuers, and stable value contract providers are generally strong financial institutions.

=== Investor Cash Flows Affect Returns ===
An influx of money to a stable value fund during a period of low interest rates can result in more investments at the current rate, which may dilute returns for investors. However, the alternative is also true. Large inflows of money into a stable value fund when interest rates are high can alternatively increase returns. Most stable value funds include a cash buffer to pay out withdrawals and minimize cash flow effects so the stable value fund crediting rates remain stable and consistently positive.

=== Employer Initiated Events ===
Certain employer initiated events can limit the liability of contract issuers, potentially leaving investors with losses. Events such as major layoffs, mergers, and bankruptcy will typically invalidate the portfolio's contracts since they increase the possibility that an issuer would have to pay out on contracts for these management initiated events. Losses in such cases are rare, since most companies generally have enough time to negotiate continued coverage for the stable value fund. Many stable value funds have survived bankruptcies without any losses, for example in the case of Enron in 2001.

== Regulations ==
Stable value funds have multiple layers of government oversight. The vast majority of funds are regulated by the Department of Labor's Employee Benefits Security Administration and must comply with the federal pension law, the Employee Retirement Income Security Act (ERISA). Stable value funds in defined contribution plans for state and local governments (457 plans) are regulated by the states, which have adopted requirements similar to ERISA.

In addition to the Department of Labor, stable value investment structures provided and/or managed by banks are regulated by the Office of the Comptroller of Currency and/or the Federal Reserve. Stable value funds offered by insurance companies are regulated by the various state insurance departments, and commingled investment funds are regulated by the Securities and Exchange Commission under the Investment Company Act.

All stable value funds must comply with accounting regulations by the Financial Accounting Standards Board (FASB) (for corporate defined contribution plans) or the Governmental Accounting Standards Board (GASB) (for state and local defined contribution plans) to qualify for contract value accounting and reporting. Generally, FASB and GASB require that a stable value fund must meet all of the following criteria:

- The contract is effected directly between the fund and issuer and prohibits the sale or assignment of the contract or its proceeds to another party without the consent of the issuer;
- The repayment of principal and interest credited to participants in the fund is a financial obligation of the issuer of the contract. Prospective interest-crediting rate adjustments are permitted as long as they are not less than zero, and the contract issuer must be a financially sound institution;
- The terms of the contract require all permitted participant-initiated transactions with the fund to occur at contract value;
- An event that limits the ability of the fund to transact at contract value with the issuer and limits the ability of the fund to transact at contract value with participants in the fund must not be probable of occurring;
- The fund itself must allow participants reasonable access to their funds.

== Role in a Portfolio ==
Stable value funds are a low risk option for retirement plans and provide stability for investors seeking to minimize volatility, which is important for an investor nearing retirement or in retirement who would want to preserve principal and minimize risk. Because of their low risk and stable, consistent returns they also can help diversify 401(k) asset allocation for all investors.

== Comparable Investments ==
=== Money Market Funds ===
A money market fund (also known as money market mutual fund) is an open-ended mutual fund that invests in short-term debt securities such as US Treasury bills and commercial paper. Money market funds are widely (though not necessarily accurately) regarded as being as safe as bank deposits yet providing a higher yield. Regulated in the US under the Investment Company Act of 1940, money market funds are important providers of liquidity to financial intermediaries. Stable value funds have outperformed money market funds in every 12-month period since 1985 with similar volatility and risk and slightly less liquidity.

=== Bond Funds ===
A bond fund is a fund that invests in bonds or other debt securities. Bond funds can be contrasted with stock funds and money funds. Bond funds typically pay periodic dividends that include interest payments on the fund's underlying securities plus periodically realized capital appreciation. Bond funds typically pay higher dividends than CDs and money market accounts. Most bond funds pay out dividends more frequently than individual bonds. Stable value funds offer returns similar to those of intermediate bond funds but with less volatility and risk, and are often recommended as a replacement for bonds in diversified portfolios.
