= ExMark =

ExMark is a term describing the relationship between a fund's return and the market index. The usual designation for this concept is R-squared, but John C. Bogle coined this expression to highlight the difference with other financial products.

For a typical mainstream equity fund, the ExMark runs from 80% to 90%, meaning that an exceedingly high proportion of its total return is explained by the performance of the overall stock market. Only the remaining 20–10% of return is explained by some combination of (1) the fund's basic strategy and (2) the tactics and investment selections of the fund's portfolio manager. An ExMark below 80% indicates significantly less predictability of relative performance. A figure of 95% or above means that a fund's return has been shaped predominantly by the action of the stock market itself. Such a fund may be a closet index fund, charging high advisory fees but providing little opportunity to add value over and above the market's return. An index fund, the return of which is entirely explained by the action of the stock market, would of course carry an ExMark of 100%.
