= Pension release =

Pension release is the removal of money from a pension fund at the age of 55 or older. Under UK law, as part of their transfer to a new provider a person can access up to 25% of their defined contribution fund tax free from the age of 55. They do not have to start taking income while the rest of the fund remains invested. The State Pension does not allow pension release.

Between April 2014 and April 2015, the entirety of a fund can be removed if it is not higher than £30,000. From April 6, 2015, there will be no limits on how much money can be removed, but all withdrawals outside of the 25% tax-free cash will be treated as taxable income.

With the exception of "pension recycling" (adding released money back into a pension to enjoy tax relief for a second time), there are no restrictions on how the money can be used by the individual. A popular use is to tackle debts before entering retirement.

Pension release is only available from a defined contribution pension fund that allows income drawdown, which is the mechanism that allows tax-free cash to be removed while keeping the rest invested. Members of a defined benefit, or final salary, scheme must transfer to a defined contribution scheme to have the option of pension release, but advice should be sought before doing so as it can mean relinquishing a number of benefits. The government has announced that only funded defined benefit schemes will be able to transfer out after April 2015, which will exclude most public sector pensions.

== Example ==
The following example shows how pension released can be used for financial planning as the interest on the debt is higher than the interest accruing on savings. The example assumes that a person has a loan of £7,000 with 17% interest, with 5 years of repayments at £170 a month remaining. They also have a pension of £28,000.

Monthly Repayments	Pension Release
The loan will be paid in full after 5 years of paying £170 each month	£7,000 is released from the pension fund, which is the 25% that can be withdrawn as a tax-free lump sum. The loan is repaid immediately
To pay the £170, a basic-rate taxpayer will need to earn £212.50 each month, with the £42.50 difference taken as income tax. Over 5 years, £12,750 needs to be earned to clear a loan of £7,000	With the loan paid off, the individual has an extra £170. If this is reinvested to increase the size of the pension, the government will add the £42.50 in tax relief. The full £212.50 that was earned ends up in the pension fund
After 5 years, the loan has been repaid. £10,200 was repaid, and £12,750 was earned to make the repayments possible. £3,200 was paid as interest and £2,550 as income tax. If a £28,000 pension had grown at 5% in the same period of time, it would be worth £35,736	After 5 years, the loan has been paid off without accruing interest, £2,550 has been received in tax relief and the monthly investments have increased the value of the pension to £39,105

Pension release is not suitable for everyone and advice from a regulated adviser should be sought before choosing to release any money from your pension.

== Differences with pension liberation ==
Pension liberation is when money is released from a pension when the individual is younger than 55 and HMRC has not given permission to do so. Such permission can only be received in rare circumstances such as terminal illness.

Most opportunities to release cash from a pension before 55 are scams, and in the first half of 2014 almost £500 million was removed from pension funds as a result of liberation scams.

"Pension liberation" works out extremely expensive, leaving the individual with a fraction of their withdrawal. HMRC imposes a 55% tax on money liberated from pensions without its permission and the scheme fee could be 20%. HMRC also charges a further 55% tax on the scheme fee.
