= Pension review =

Pension review is a component of retirement planning, where a pension is examined to determine how well it is performing. This may include what the annual fees amount to, if the pension is growing at a reasonable level, how it is invested, if it could perform better with different investments, and if the fund will be able to provide the desired retirement. Pension reviews may be conducted by the company holding the pension, or by independent companies.

As an example, a 30-year-old could have a pension review in an effort to give their pension a good start. They may find out they are paying 5% in annual fees across their three pension funds and that they are invested in low-risk options, but if they consolidate into a single fund in medium-risk investments their annual fees would drop to 1.1% and the fund is more likely, but not guaranteed, to grow at a faster rate.

A 55-year-old person may have a pension review to determine whether they could access their 25% tax-free cash. This person's review may show that they have paid high fees for decades and their fund has not grown at the levels hoped for, so removing a chunk of cash is not advisable, or they could find out that they would be able to withdraw enough tax-free cash to clear some outstanding debt and still have a suitable income either from an annuity or income drawdown. Pension reviews should only be conducted when the pension fund owner contacts a company to do one, as the Financial Conduct Authority (FCA) warns against cold-calling scams, where a company will contact a person out of the blue and offer to review their pension.

The FCA has a register of regulated companies and it is advised that a person verifies that any company they are considering to perform their pension review is listed on the register. This ensures the company is authorised to provide regulated advice.
