= Income fund =

Type of fund

An income fund is a fund whose goal is to provide an income from investments. It is usually organized through a trust or partnership, rather than a corporation, to obtain more efficient flow through tax consequences in relation to the income that it earns and distributes.

An income fund is a type of asset allocation fund.

Income funds are often assumed to be bond funds but may be stock funds instead and be more accurately called equity income funds. Typically, they hold stocks with a good history of paying dividends. In fact, a typical income fund holds both stocks and bonds to gain some of the strengths of both.

The point in any case is that the investor is more interested in income than capital gains, perhaps with the intention the fund will never be sold.

Income funds are often used as the endpoint for target-date funds. As each target-date fund approaches and passes its target date, it becomes more similar to the fund provider's income fund. At some point past the target date, the target-date fund may be merged into the income fund, which is then owned by all investors whose target dates are some time in the past.

== See also ==
- Stock fund
- Bond fund
- Money market fund
- Target date fund
- Income trust
- Exchange fund
