= Simons' formula =

Mathematical formula

In the mathematical field of differential geometry, the Simons formula (also known as the Simons identity, and in some variants as the Simons inequality) is a fundamental equation in the study of minimal submanifolds. It was discovered by James Simons in 1968. It can be viewed as a formula for the Laplacian of the second fundamental form of a Riemannian submanifold. It is often quoted and used in the less precise form of a formula or inequality for the Laplacian of the length of the second fundamental form.

In the case of a hypersurface M of Euclidean space, the formula asserts that

$$\Delta h=\operatorname{Hess}H+Hh^2-|h|^2h,$$

where, relative to a local choice of unit normal vector field, h is the second fundamental form, H is the mean curvature, and h^{2} is the symmetric 2-tensor on M given by h^{2}_{ij} = g^{pq}h_{ip}h_{qj}. This has the consequence that

$$\frac{1}{2}\Delta|h|^2=|\nabla h|^2-|h|^4+\langle h,\operatorname{Hess}H\rangle+H\operatorname{tr}(A^3)$$

where A is the shape operator. In this setting, the derivation is particularly simple:

$$\begin{align}
\Delta h_{ij}&=\nabla^p\nabla_p h_{ij}\\
&=\nabla^p\nabla_ih_{jp}\\
&=\nabla_i\nabla^p h_{jp}-{{R^p}_{ij}}^qh_{qp}-{{R^p}_{ip}}^qh_{jq}\\
&=\nabla_i\nabla_jH-(h^{pq}h_{ij}-h_j^ph_i^q)h_{qp}-(h^{pq}h_{ip}-Hh_i^q)h_{jq}\\
&=\nabla_i\nabla_jH-|h|^2h+Hh^2;
\end{align}$$

the only tools involved are the Codazzi equation (equalities #2 and 4), the Gauss equation (equality #4), and the commutation identity for covariant differentiation (equality #3). The more general case of a hypersurface in a Riemannian manifold requires additional terms to do with the Riemann curvature tensor. In the even more general setting of arbitrary codimension, the formula involves a complicated polynomial in the second fundamental form.
