= Guaranteed investment contract =

Contract for repayment with interest

A guaranteed investment contract (GIC) is a contract that guarantees repayment of principal and a fixed or floating interest rate for a predetermined period of time. Guaranteed investment contracts are typically issued by life insurance companies qualified for favorable tax status under the Internal Revenue Code (for example, 401(k) plans). A GIC is used primarily as a vehicle that yields a higher return than a savings account or United States Treasury securities and GICs are often used as investments for stable value funds. GICs are sometimes referred to as funding agreements, although this term is often reserved for contracts sold to non-qualified institutions.

Example: Funds obtained through a municipal bond issuance will generally take time to be drawn down. Depositing the bond proceeds in a GIC gives the bond issuer the liquidity of having the funds available while earning a higher rate of return than it would earn in a money market account. GICs are considered safe vehicles since most insurance companies offering them are rated in the AA to AAA range.

The term "GIC" is sometimes used in the context of guaranteed investment agreements, or GIAs.

== History ==
As of 1990, a large amount of people's 401k retirement money had been invested into GICs. However, when life insurance companies started failing, people began to lose their faith in GICs as a product. For example, Executive Life Insurance Company had some junk bond problems in 1990, and people started redeeming their GICs. So many people redeemed Executive GICs that it couldn't pay all that it owed. It was 'failed' and seized by the government. Investors who had bought GICs, such as the Unisys employee fund, found that their money was frozen. This resulted in a lawsuit against Unisys.

In 1995, the New York State Insurance Department enabled the 'monoline' municipal-bond insurance companies to write insurance on GICs. Thus if the GIC issuer failed, the monoline insurer could pay back investors instead. Insured GICs were called "wrapped" GICs.

In the late 2000s, AIG, a holding company and not an insurance company, was bailed out by the federal government to the tune of over a hundred billion dollars. The NY Times reported that some of the government money (at least 9 billion dollars) was used to pay out on "Guaranteed Investment Agreement" contracts that AIG had sold to investors.

In 2010, many GIC sellers were sued by counties such as Los Angeles and Oakland over alleged price fixing regarding GICs. Many large banks and other companies were named as "co-conspirators".

== See also ==
- Stable value fund
