= Pension liberation =

Scam in the United Kingdom

In the United Kingdom, pension liberation is a term used by confidence tricksters that purports to allow individuals to access the funds within a pension before the age of 55 when permission has not been provided by HM Revenue and Customs (HMRC).

== Background ==
Except in rare circumstances, such as terminal illness, pensions can only be legally accessed from the age of 55, and most opportunities to do so earlier are scams. Scammers use confusion with pension release to convince the unsuspecting that there is a legal loophole that allows them to access the money, but the High Court ruled in May 2014 that no such loophole exists.

"Liberated" money is typically placed into overseas funds, which are high risk with little to no regulation. Pension liberation carries large costs. HMRC imposes a 55% tax charge on any money released, and the scheme could have very high fees in excess of 20%. HMRC also charges a further 55% tax on the scheme's fee. The table below gives an example breakdown of the tax and fees, demonstrating how little the pension holder receives:

Example breakdown of the tax and fees
		Costs and charges	Sum remaining
Money "liberated"	£20,000		£20,000
Tax charge	55%	£11,000	£9,000
Scheme fee	20%	£4000	£5,000
Tax on scheme fee	55%	£2,200	£2,800
Total		£17,200	£2,800

== Consequences of pension liberation ==
Between the end of 2013 and July 2014, the amount of money lost to liberation schemes increased 18%. A campaign started by the Pensions Regulator in February 2013 led to frozen assets in 20 schemes, the suspension of 18 pension liberation websites and seven arrests. Pension liberation can leave people in financial ruin, and suicides have been reported as a result. The Financial Times reported the suicide a 40-year-old man who did not receive the £17,000 lump sum promised to him from a liberation scheme.

Pension liberation operators may use website promotions, cold calls or text messages to encourage people to access their pension before 55. The Financial Conduct Authority warns against cold-calling scams and it is advised to only work with a company registered on the FCA's list of regulated companies.

== Differences from pension release ==
Pension release is when a person removes money from their pension once they are 55 or older. As of 2015 UK law allows up to 25% of a defined contribution pension to be released tax free from the age of 55. People can be tricked into a pension liberation scam if they are unaware that they cannot access their pension at a younger age. The remainder of the fund stays invested until the individual decides to start drawing an income from it.

Between April 2014 and April 2015 funds not exceeding £30,000 can be taken in their entirety, but from April 2015, restrictions on how much money is removed from a pension fund will be lifted, and a marginal rate of tax will be applied to withdrawals. The age limit of 55 will remain.
