= Henry B. R. Brown =

American financial consultant

Henry Bedinger Rust Brown (February 13, 1926 – August 11, 2008) was an American financial consultant known for inventing the world's first money market fund, the Reserve Fund, with Bruce R. Bent in 1970.

== Early career ==
Brown was born on February 13, 1926, in Pittsburgh, where his father worked as an executive for a company that manufactured blast furnaces. After secondary education at Choate, he attended Harvard University, where he was a cartoonist for the Harvard Lampoon. After graduating from college he worked for Chemical Bank in the early 1950s and later worked for a company that would later become part of Citibank. In 1963 he joined the Teachers Insurance and Annuity Association in a position where he managed the firm's securities investments.

== Inventing the money market fund ==
Until it was phased out in 1986, a United States banking law known as Regulation Q, which was enacted by Congress during the Great Depression as part of the Glass–Steagall Act, prohibited banks from paying interest on demand deposit checking accounts. While well-heeled investors could earn high yields by purchasing certificates of deposit or commercial paper, investments that required investments that could reach hundreds of thousands of dollars, typical consumers were effectively frozen out of this market. Banks in the United States were able to gather substantial funds that they were able to lend out with interest without paying any returns on the funds they had received from depositors.

Sitting around their office in August 1969 and brainstorming, Bent suggested that a mutual fund could be created that would allow small investors to combine their resources and gain access to the higher yields available from purchasing a pool of CDs and commercial paper. Neither of them knew anything about the intricacies and legalities of opening a mutual fund, but research by Brown confirmed that the type of money market mutual fund that they had conceived of would be legal in all 50 states. They established the Reserve Fund to implement their idea, which languished in its first several years, building up $250,000 in debts. Early on, individuals and corporations could invest in the fund by putting in as little as $1,000. Shares in the fund were $100 each, with "dividends" paid as additional fractional shares in the account, keeping the value of each fund share at a constant price. The fund charged a management fee of 50 basis points. Though other banks and investment firms were looking at creating money market funds of their own, Bent and Brown were confident that the enormous size of the potential market and their ability to keep costs low would allow them to compete with their larger competitors.

They turned the corner after an article in the January 7, 1973, issue of The New York Times brought much-needed attention to their innovation. By the end of that year they had garnered investments of $100 million. The money market fund industry grew by leaps and bounds, becoming an industry that had amassed $3.5 trillion in assets by the time of Brown's death in 2008, with the Reserve Fund alone accounting for $62 billion in assets.

The invention of the money market fund by Bent and Brown was credited by the American Museum of Financial History, an affiliate of the Smithsonian Institution, as a major innovation in the financial history of the United States. Paul Samuelson, winner of the Nobel Memorial Prize in Economic Sciences in 1970, said in a speech in 2001 that Bent and Brown deserved to win a Nobel prize themselves. Upon hearing of Samuelson's statement, Brown remarked that he couldn't "say that our 'invention' resulted from any brilliance on our part", continuing that "it was actually a combination of the threat of starvation and pure greed that drove us to it".

Money market funds seek to maintain a stable $1.00 net asset value, never losing money. In the financial turmoil following the September 2008 bankruptcy of Lehman Brothers, just one month after Brown's death, the Reserve Fund saw a run on its investments after it marked down to zero the value of assets it had invested in Lehman's securities, forcing it to "break the buck", leaving investors who had held onto their investments in the fund to lose as much as three to five percent of their investment.

== Personal life ==
After his retirement from the financial industry, he joined with partner Chris Gerow in competing in the annual Punkin Chunkin event held in Delaware.

Brown died at age 82 of an abdominal aneurysm on August 11, 2008, at his home in Leesburg, Virginia. His residence had been owned by members of his family for more than 200 years. Brown's grandfather was United States federal judge Addison Brown, who was also a botanist and one of the founders of the New York Botanical Garden. An earlier ancestor was Virginia statesman Richard Henry Lee, whose June 1776 resolution led to the United States Declaration of Independence. Brown was unsure just how many "greats" of a grandfather Lee was to him.

He was survived by his wife, Betsey, as well as by two daughters (Elizabeth and Harriet), two sons (Peter and Alexander) and 10 grandchildren.
