= Math for America =

- Formation: January 2004; 21 years ago
- Founder: Jim Simons
- Founded at: New York City
- Website: mathforamerica.org

Math for America (MfA) is a nonprofit organization, founded in January 2004 by American billionaire mathematician, hedge fund manager, and philanthropist Jim Simons to promote recruitment and retention of mathematics teachers in New York City secondary schools.

== History ==
According to Simons, he founded the program to address failures in the US education system to produce students highly qualified in STEM skills and knowledge, which reduces America's ability to compete in the global economy. He perceived the cause of the failure as low quality teachers, and saw that problem in turn as being caused by low salaries, lack of prestige, and lack of support and good training making the job unattractive to qualified candidates, many of whom could get jobs in lucrative fields like quantitative finance.

Simons thus created the program to provide math and science teachers with higher salaries and better training and funded it with a $25 million pledge from his charitable foundation, the Simons Foundation. Simons pledged an additional $25 million in 2006.

In the initial program, people who were accepted into the program who had degrees in math but were not teachers received a stipend of about $18,000 per year for five years from MfA in addition to their salaries and received free tuition to a high quality one year Master's program in teaching, as well as mentoring and professional development support after the first year. The five-year period was selected because that is the period during which most new teachers drop out; the starting salary of a NYC math teacher with a graduate degree was around $50,000 at that time. The program also offered stipends to qualified existing teachers, to promote their retention in the field. People who were accepted into the program also had to agree that they would pay back some of the support they had received, if they dropped out of the program.

By 2011 MfA had expanded to science fields as well as math, and organizations had been established and funded in San Diego, Los Angeles, Berkeley, Calif., Utah, Boston, and the District of Columbia. Each site was autonomous, with its own board, fund-raising, and programs tailored to address local needs, but all coordinated with the founding organization and received funding from the Simons Foundation. It had also added two programs to support existing teachers in its New York City location: a Master Teacher Fellowship for experienced secondary school math teachers and the Early Career Fellowship for newer teachers.

By 2012 the program was working with 330 teachers in the New York City schools, and due to hiring freezes in the school system, reduced the size of its new teacher program and expanded its program to provide stipends to existing teachers; it also announced that in 2013 it would expand to include science teachers and middle school teachers. That year it also started a program offering $5,000 stipends to school administrators who attended seven MfA meetings per year. Its budget before 2012 had been $20M per year and it planned to increase the budget to $30M per year to support the expansion for experienced teachers.

In 2013 New York State launched a state-funded "Master Teacher" program to provide stipends to qualified existing teachers modeled on MfA's program.

Ongoing financial support for MfA programs comes from private donors and government grants.

== Activities ==
From 2013 through 2017, the nonprofit contributed approximately $110 million towards fellowships across the United States. This sum included over $15 million in stipends towards over 1,000 teachers in 2017.
