= Jim Simons =

American mathematician and billionaire (1938–2024)

James Simons
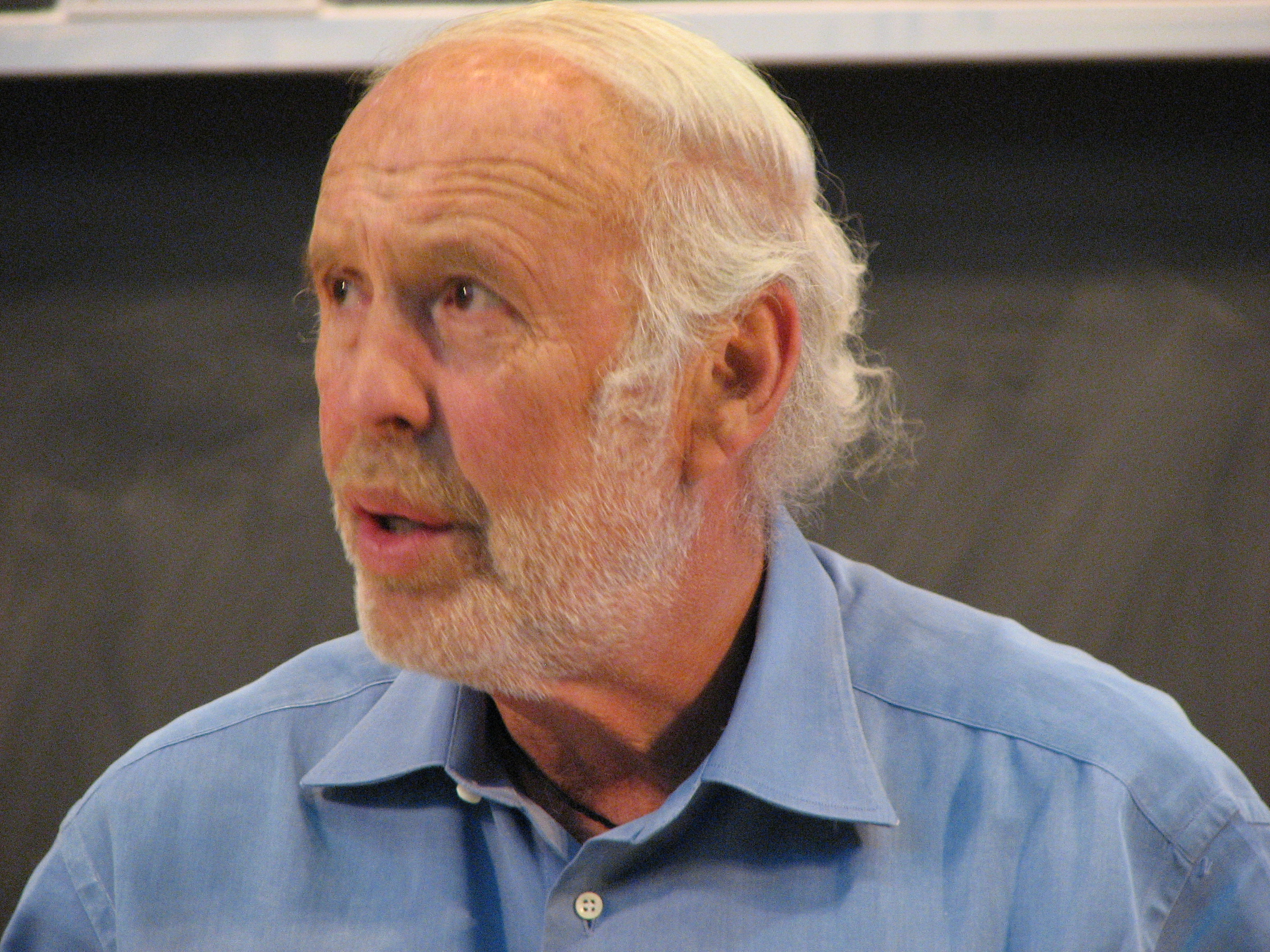
- Simons in 2007
- Born: April 25, 1938; Cambridge, Massachusetts, U.S.
- Died: May 10, 2024 (aged 86); New York City, U.S.
- Education: Massachusetts Institute of Technology (BS); University of California, Berkeley (PhD)
- Occupations: Hedge fund manager, investor, mathematician, philanthropist
- Known for: Founding and managing Renaissance Technologies; Simons cone Simons formula Simons' theorem Chern–Simons form
- Spouses: Barbara Bluestein (m. 1959; div. 1974) Marilyn Hawrys (m. 1977)
- Children: 5, including Nat
- Awards: Oswald Veblen Prize (1976)
- Scientific career
- Fields: Differential geometry, cryptography, quantitative financial analysis
- Thesis: On the transitivity of holonomy systems (1962)
- Doctoral advisor: Bertram Kostant
- Doctoral students: Jeff Cheeger

James Harris Simons (April 25, 1938 – May 10, 2024) was an American hedge fund manager, investor, mathematician, and philanthropist. At the time of his death, Simons's net worth was estimated to be $31.4 billion, making him the 55th-richest person in the world. He was the founder of Renaissance Technologies, a quantitative hedge fund based in East Setauket, New York. He and his fund are known to be quantitative investors, using mathematical models and algorithms to make investment gains from market inefficiencies. Due to the long-term aggregate investment returns of Renaissance and its Medallion Fund, Simons was called the "greatest investor on Wall Street" and more specifically "the most successful hedge fund manager of all time".

Simons developed the Chern–Simons form (with Shiing-Shen Chern), and contributed to the development of string theory by providing a theoretical framework to combine geometry and topology with quantum field theory.

In 1994, Simons and his wife, Marilyn, founded the Simons Foundation to support research in mathematics and fundamental sciences. The foundation is the top benefactor of Stony Brook University, Marilyn's alma mater, and is a major contributor to his alma maters, the Massachusetts Institute of Technology and the University of California, Berkeley. Simons was a member of the boards of the Stony Brook Foundation, the MIT Corporation, and the Simons Laufer Mathematical Sciences Institute in Berkeley, and chaired the boards of Math for America, the Simons Foundation, and Renaissance Technologies. In 2023, the Simons Foundation gave $500 million to Stony Brook University, the second-largest donation to a public university in U.S. history. In 2016, the International Astronomical Union named asteroid 6618 Jimsimons, which Clyde Tombaugh discovered in 1936, after Simons in honor of his contributions to mathematics and philanthropy.

== Early life and education ==
James Harris Simons was born on April 25, 1938, to an American Jewish family, the only child of Marcia (née Kantor) and Matthew Simons, and raised in Brookline, Massachusetts.

He received a bachelor's degree in mathematics from the Massachusetts Institute of Technology in 1958 which he completed in three years and a PhD in mathematics from the University of California, Berkeley under the supervision of Bertram Kostant in 1961, at age 23. After graduating from MIT, Simons traveled from Boston to Bogotá, Colombia, on a motor scooter.

== Academic and scientific career ==
Simons's mathematical and physics work primarily focused on the geometry and topology of manifolds. His 1962 Berkeley PhD thesis, written under the direction of Bertram Kostant, gave a new proof of Berger's classification of the holonomy groups of Riemannian manifolds. He subsequently began to work with Shiing-Shen Chern on the theory of characteristic classes, eventually discovering the Chern–Simons secondary characteristic classes of 3-manifolds. Later, mathematical physicist Albert Schwarz discovered early topological quantum field theory, an application of the Chern–Simons form. It is also related to the Yang-Mills functional on 4-manifolds, and has had an effect on modern physics. These and other contributions to geometry and topology led to Simons becoming the 1976 recipient of the American Mathematical Society (AMS) Oswald Veblen Prize in Geometry. In 2014, he was elected to the U.S. National Academy of Sciences.

In 1964, Simons worked with the National Security Agency to break codes. Between 1964 and 1968, he was on the research staff of the Communications Research Division of the Institute for Defense Analysis (CRD of IDA) and taught mathematics at the Massachusetts Institute of Technology and Harvard University. Simons also tried starting a trading company named iStar with colleagues including Richard Leibler, but was discovered by management, and the effort failed. After being forced to leave the IDA due to his public opposition to the Vietnam War, he joined the faculty at Stony Brook University. From 1968 to 1978, he chaired Stony Brook's math department. In 1973, IBM asked Simons to attack the block cipher Lucifer, an early but direct precursor to the Data Encryption Standard (DES). In 2004, Simons founded Math for America, a nonprofit organization with a mission to improve mathematics education in U.S. public schools by recruiting more highly qualified teachers.

== Business career ==
=== Renaissance Technologies ===
External videos
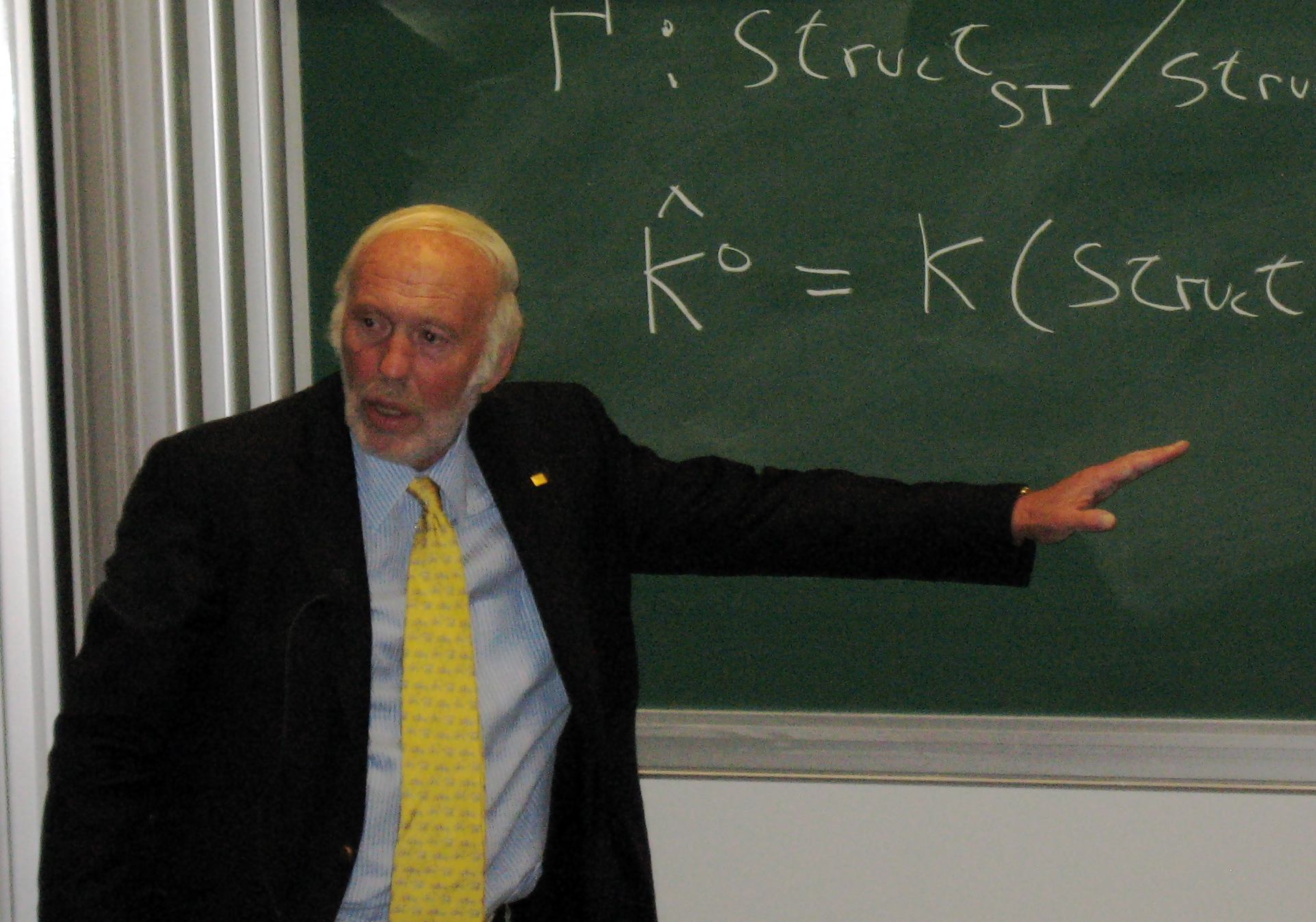
- A Rare Interview with the Mathematician Who Cracked Wall Street, 23:03, TED Talks
- The Carnegie Medal of Philanthropy Ceremony – 17th October 2013, 1:31:40 (Simons section at 52:00–1:05:30), Scottish Parliament

Simons founded the hedge fund management firm Monemetrics, which he later renamed Renaissance Technologies. He gradually realized that it should be possible to make mathematical models of the data he was collecting. After hiring mathematicians such as Leonard E. Baum and James Ax, Renaissance established the Medallion Fund in 1988.

The Medallion Fund, which is closed to outside investors, has earned over $100 billion in trading profits since its inception in 1988. This is a 66.1% average gross annual return or a 39.1% average net annual return between 1988 and 2018. Renaissance Technologies manages three other funds—Renaissance Institutional Equities Fund (RIEF), Renaissance Institutional Diversified Alpha (RIDA), and Renaissance Institutional Diversified Global Equity Fund—that as of April 2019 had approximately $55 billion in combined assets and were open to outside investors.

"It's startling to see such a highly successful mathematician achieve success in another field," says Edward Witten, professor of physics at the Institute for Advanced Study in Princeton, New Jersey and considered by many of his peers to be the most accomplished theoretical physicist alive.

In 2006, Simons was named Financial Engineer of the Year by the International Association of Financial Engineers. In 2020, he was estimated to have personally earned $2.6 billion, $2.8 billion in 2007, $1.7 billion in 2006, $1.5 billion in 2005 (the largest compensation among hedge fund managers that year), and $670 million in 2004. On October 10, 2009, Simons announced he would retire on January 1, 2010, but remain at Renaissance as nonexecutive chairman.

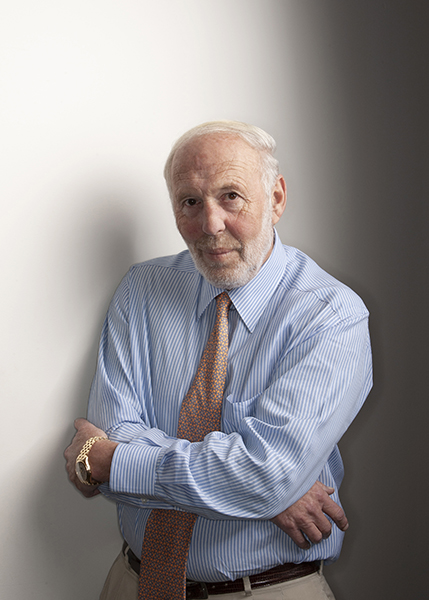
Simons in 2007

== Wealth and personal life ==
In 2014, Simons reportedly earned $1.2 billion, including a share of his firm's management and performance fees, cash compensation, and stock and option awards. According to Forbes magazine, Simons had a net worth of $30 billion in 2023, making him the 25th-richest person on the Forbes 400 list. In 2018, he was ranked 23rd by Forbes, and in October 2019, his net worth was estimated at $21.6 billion. In March 2019, he was named one of the highest-earning hedge fund managers and traders by Forbes. At the time of his death, Simons's net worth was estimated to be $31.4 billion, making him the 55th-richest person on Forbes's 2024 The World's Billionaires list.

Simons shunned the limelight and rarely gave interviews, citing Benjamin the Donkey in Animal Farm: "'God gave me a tail to keep off the flies. But I'd rather have had no tail and no flies.' That's kind of the way I feel about publicity."

Simons was married twice and had five children. In 1996, his son Paul, aged 34, was killed in a car accident while riding his bicycle in Long Island. In 2003, his son Nicholas, aged 24, drowned on a trip to Bali, Indonesia. Simons's three surviving children all run charities of their own: Liz Simons founded the Heising-Simons Foundation, Nathaniel Simons founded the Sea Change Foundation, and Audrey Simons founded the Foundation For A Just Society.

Simons owned a motor yacht named Archimedes. It was built at the Dutch yacht builder Royal Van Lent and delivered to Simons in 2008.

Simons did not wear socks. He was known for smoking up to two packs a day of Merit cigarettes.

== Political and economic views ==
Simons was a major contributor to Democratic Party political action committees. According to OpenSecrets, he was the #5 donor to federal candidates in the 2016 election cycle, behind Renaissance Technologies' co-CEO Robert Mercer, who ranked #1 and generally donates to Republicans. Simons donated $7 million to Hillary Clinton's Priorities USA Action, $2.6 million to the House and Senate Majority PACs, and $500,000 to EMILY's List. He also donated $25,000 to Republican senator Lindsey Graham's super PAC. From 2006 Simons contributed about $30.6 million to federal campaigns. Since 1990, employees of Renaissance Technologies have contributed over $59,081,152 to federal campaigns. It has spent $3,730,000 on lobbying as of 2016.

In August 2020, Simons donated $1.5 million to the Senate Majority PAC, a Democratic super-PAC.

== Controversies ==
According to The Wall Street Journal in May 2009, investors questioned Simons about the dramatic performance gap between Renaissance Technologies' portfolios. The Medallion Fund, which has been available exclusively to current and past employees and their families, surged 80% in 2008 despite hefty fees; the Renaissance Institutional Equities Fund (RIEF), owned by outsiders, lost money in both 2008 and 2009; RIEF declined 16% in 2008.

On July 22, 2014, Simons was subject to bipartisan condemnation by the U.S. Senate Permanent Subcommittee on Investigations for the use of complex basket options to shield day-to-day trading (usually subject to higher ordinary income tax rates) as long-term capital gains. "Renaissance Technologies was able to avoid paying more than $6 billion in taxes by disguising its day-to-day stock trades as long term investments", said Senator John McCain, the committee's ranking Republican, in his opening statement.

In 2015, The New York Times reported that Simons was involved in one of the biggest tax battles of the year, with Renaissance Technologies "under review by the IRS over a loophole that saved their fund an estimated $6.8 billion in taxes over roughly a decade." In September 2021, it was announced that Simons and his colleagues would pay billions of dollars in back taxes, interest, and penalties to resolve the dispute, one of the biggest in IRS history.

== Philanthropy ==
Simons gave over $4 billion to philanthropic causes. In 1994, he and his wife, Marilyn Hawrys Simons, co-founded the Simons Foundation, a charitable organization that supports projects related to education, health, and scientific research. The Simons Foundation established the Simons Foundation Autism Research Initiative (SFARI) in 2003 as a scientific initiative within the Simons Foundation's suite of programs. SFARI's mission is to improve the understanding, diagnosis and treatment of autism spectrum disorders.

In 2004, Simons founded Math for America with an initial pledge of $25 million from the Simons Foundation, a pledge he doubled in 2006. The foundation continues to fund its operations, contributing nearly $22 million in 2018.

Simons was among the largest contributors to his undergraduate alma mater, MIT. The couple and their foundation funded the renovation of the building housing the mathematics department, which in 2016 was named in their honor, and endowed the Simons Center for the Social Brain. Simons was a life member emeritus of the MIT Corporation.

Simons was a major benefactor of his graduate alma mater, Berkeley. In 2012, the Simons Foundation pledged $60 million to Berkeley to establish the Simons Institute for the Theory of Computing, the world's leading institute for collaborative research in theoretical computer science. In 2020, the foundation made separate grants to Berkeley totaling over $46 million to increase the institute's endowment and support its operations. In October 2023, the university announced that the Simons Foundation had awarded the institute an additional $25 million as a matching pledge. Simons and his wife also made major grants to Berkeley affiliates, notably the Simons Laufer Mathematical Sciences Institute and Berkeley Lab.

In 2016, the Simons Foundation established the Flatiron Institute to house five groups of computational scientists (each with 60 or more PhD level researchers). The institute consists of four cores or departments: CCB (Center for Computational Biology), CCA (Center for Computational Astrophysics), CCQ (Center for Computational Quantum mechanics), CCM (Center for Computational Mathematics), and CCN (Center for Computational Neuroscience).

In memory of his son Paul, whom he had with his first wife, Barbara Simons, he established Avalon Nature Preserve, a 130-acre (0.53 km^{2}) nature preserve in Stony Brook. The Avalon preserve was extended to 216 acres in 2024.

Another son, Nick Simons, drowned at age 24 while on a trip to Bali in 2003. Nick had worked in Nepal. The Simonses became large donors to Nepalese healthcare through the Nick Simons Institute.

In 2006, the Simonses donated $25 million to Stony Brook University through the Stony Brook Foundation, the largest donation ever to a State University of New York school at the time. On February 27, 2008, Governor Eliot Spitzer announced a $60 million donation by the Simons Foundation to found the Simons Center for Geometry and Physics at Stony Brook, the largest gift to a public university in New York state history. In 2011, the couple broke that record again with a $150 million donation to Stony Brook, which went to research in medical sciences, the construction of a life sciences building, the creation of a neurosciences institute and a center for biological imaging, the study of cancer and infectious diseases, 35 new endowed professorships, and 40 fellowships for graduate students. To secure the donation, Stony Brook was allowed to raise its annual tuition in opposition to traditional New York state policy. In 2023, the university announced that it had received a $500 million endowment gift from the Simons Foundation, the second-largest gift ever to a public university.

== Death ==
Simons died peacefully in New York City on May 10, 2024, at age 86. He was active in the work of his foundation until the end of his life.

== Legacy and awards ==
In 2008, he was inducted into Institutional Investor Alpha's Hedge Fund Manager Hall of Fame.

He was named by the Financial Times in 2006 as "the world's smartest billionaire". He was elected to the American Philosophical Society in 2007. In 2011, he was included in the 50 Most Influential ranking of Bloomberg Markets Magazine.

A book about Simons and his investing methods, The Man Who Solved the Market: How Jim Simons Launched the Quant Revolution by Gregory Zuckerman, was released in 2019. He was awarded honorary doctorates by York University and the University of Edinburgh in 2016, and Trinity College Dublin in 2018.

== Publications and works ==
- Simons, J. (August 1967). "Minimal Cones, Plateau's Problem, and the Bernstein Conjecture". Proc Natl Acad Sci U S A. 58 (2): 410–411. Bibcode:1967PNAS...58..410S. doi:10.1073/pnas.58.2.410. PMC 335649. PMID 16578656.
- Simons, James (July 1968). "Minimal Varieties in Riemannian Manifolds". Annals of Mathematics. 88 (1): 62–105. doi:10.2307/1970556. hdl:10338.dmlcz/144360. JSTOR 1970556.
- Chern, S.-S.; Simons, J. (April 1971). "Some Cohomology Classes in Principal Fiber Bundles and Their Application to Riemannian Geometry". Proc Natl Acad Sci U S A. 68 (4): 791–794. Bibcode:1971PNAS...68..791C. doi:10.1073/pnas.68.4.791. PMC 389044. PMID 16591916.
- Cheeger, J.; Simons, J. (1973). "Differential characters and geometric invariants". In Geometry and Topology (College Park, Md., 1983/84), Lecture Notes in Math. (1985). 1167: 50–80.
- Chern, Shiing-Shen; Simons, James (January 1974). "Characteristic forms and geometric invariants". Annals of Mathematics. 99 (1): 48–69. doi:10.2307/1971013. JSTOR 1971013.
- Bourguignon, J.-P.; Lawson, H. B.; Simons, J. (April 1979). "Stability and gap phenomena for Yang-Mills fields". Proc Natl Acad Sci U S A. 76 (4): 1550–1553. Bibcode:1979PNAS...76.1550B. doi:10.1073/pnas.76.4.1550. PMC 383426. PMID 16592637.

== See also ==
- Chern–Simons theory
- Bernstein's problem
- Plateau's problem
- List of Massachusetts Institute of Technology alumni
- List of people and organizations named in the Paradise Papers
- List of University of California, Berkeley alumni
