= Target date fund =

Type of collective investment fund

stylized glide path of a target date fund, shifting investments to become more conservative over time

A target date fund (TDF), also known as a lifecycle fund, dynamic-risk fund, or age-based fund, is a collective investment scheme, often a mutual fund or a collective trust fund, designed to provide a simple investment solution through a portfolio whose asset allocation mix becomes more conservative as the target date (usually retirement) approaches.

== History ==
Target-date funds were invented by Donald Luskin and Larry Tint of Wells Fargo Investment Advisors (later Barclays Global Investors, BGI), and first introduced in the early 1990s by BGI. Their popularity in the US increased significantly in recent years due in part to the auto-enrollment legislation Pension Protection Act of 2006 that created the need for safe-harbor type Qualifying Default Investment Alternatives, such as target-date funds, for 401(k) savings plans. With the UK enacting auto-enrollment legislation in 2012, target-date funds are used by the National Employment Savings Trust (NEST), and are expected to become increasingly popular as their design should satisfy the Department for Work and Pensions's eligible default fund criteria.

A similar approach, called age-based asset allocation, was proposed by Mark Kantrowitz in the mid-1990s and was rapidly adopted by all "529" college savings plans.

== Design ==
Target Date Funds are investment vehicles that are designed to help in managing an investor’s assets depending on their particular target retirement dates. The individual picks a suitable target date fund and then allows the fund managers to gradually change the composition of assets from equity-dominated portfolios to fixed-income dominated portfolios as the target date approaches. The funds are not guaranteeing any returns; instead, they are simply investment vehicles designed to be used for saving purposes by individuals planning to retire.

Target-date funds' asset allocation mix typically provides exposure to return-seeking assets, such as equities, in early years when risk capacity is higher, and becomes increasingly conservative as time progresses with exposure switched progressively towards capital-preservation assets, such as government- and index-linked bonds.

The speed with which a target date fund de-risks its asset allocation is known in the industry as the "glide-path", using the analogy of an airplane (the fund, presumably) coming in for a landing (the landing being, presumably, arriving at the Target Date with the appropriately low-risk mix of underlying assets).

By taking a managed, or stochastic, approach to de-risking the fund, target-date funds offer a higher level of both technical and fiduciary care than earlier lifestyling techniques that rely on an automated, or deterministic, approach.

The theoretical underpinnings to glidepath design are based on combining modern portfolio theory, with the theory of "Human Capital", the present value of expected future earnings.

== The Glidepath ==
The strategic asset allocation model over time is known as the glidepath illustrating how an investment strategy becomes increasingly conservative over time towards the target date. An example of a glidepath for a selection of savings strategies for the UK market is shown in the above graphic. Generally, each fund's managements provide different glidepaths depending upon the end requirement of each client (a lump sum for withdrawal or an income producing portfolio for income drawdown), in terms of different target dates.

== Nudge and behavioral economics ==
Target Date Funds are commonly used as default funds as they make it easier for savers to select a savings strategy. This reduces the risk of inferior outcomes that behavioral tendencies might create.

According to 2016 research study of retirement plan participants, 74% of respondents would like to see more socially responsible investments in their retirement plan offerings and most (78%) believe it is important to make the world a better place while growing their personal assets.

A 2016 Survey of Defined Contribution Plan Participants found that 71% of millennial-age investors would be "more willing to contribute to their retirement plan if they knew their investments were doing social good". The survey also finds 84% of millennials want their "investments to reflect their personal values" and 77% want more socially responsible investments in their retirement planning.

== In the United States ==
In the US, the use of Target Date Funds accelerated from 2006 onwards with the introduction of automatic-enrollment pensions legislation, where the convenience of a single 'fund for life' made them the most popular type of default strategy. Since that, time TDF assets under management have grown more than 10x reaching $763 billion at end 2015. As of March 2020, assets in target-date mutual funds and collective investment trusts (CITs) totaled approximately $1.9 trillion. At the end of 2020, target-date assets in CITs reached $1.18 trillion according to data from Morningstar. Target-date mutual funds held $1.57 trillion.

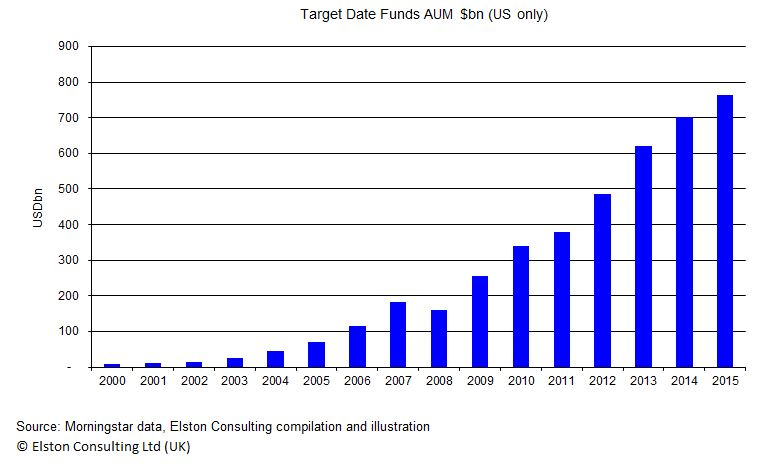
TDF growth in the US from 2000

The main Target Date Benchmarks in the US are:

S&P Target Date Indices Dow Jones Target Date Indices Morningstar Lifetime Allocation Indexes

Major TDF managers in the United States include Fidelity, Vanguard, T. Rowe Price, BlackRock (which manages the "Lifecycle Funds" – the target-date funds within the US Government Thrift Savings Plan), Principal Funds, Wells Fargo Advantage, American Century, and Northern Trust.

Note that the actual sizes of the books of different managers are difficult to estimate, as many hold assets in vehicles other than mutual funds. Northern Trust, for example, uses Collective Trust Funds (CTFs), which typically do not figure in Morningstar or Bloomberg estimates of AUM.

== In the United Kingdom ==
In the UK, the use of Target Date Funds is gaining traction, with the first launch in 2003, and current AUM estimated to be approximately £4.0bn. This is expected to increase with the advent of automatic enrolment pensions legislation.

Major TDF managers in the UK include:

Retail: Architas BirthStar (managed by AllianceBernstein), Fidelity

Institutional: AllianceBernstein, BirthStar, BlackRock, Fidelity, JPMorgan, NEST, State Street Global Advisers

Multi-employer pensions schemes (also known as 'master trusts') are amongst the early adopters of Target Date Funds in the UK market.

BlackRock Master Trust: BlackRock Lifepath Target Date Funds

Carey Workplace Pension Trust: BirthStar Target Date Funds

Intelligent Money: IM Optimum Portfolios Intelligent Money provides Target Date Portfolios (rather than Funds).

Lighthouse Pensions Trust: BirthStar Target Date Funds

Target Date Benchmarks in the UK are:

FTSE UK DC Benchmarks

== Controversy ==
The funds are not without their critics, who point to the unexpected volatility of some near-dated target-date funds in the 2008 financial crisis, suggesting they were not as conservatively positioned as their name would imply. While this is expected in the earlier phases of capital accumulation, it was unexpected at the money-market and bond stage of near-dated funds. In response to this, the SEC and DoL hosted a joint hearing on Examining Target Date Funds in June 2009, which found that while target-date funds were generally a welcome innovation, disclosure had to be improved to ensure investors were fully aware of a target-date fund glidepath, which may differ from manager to manager. The rules on disclosures for target-date funds were published by the SEC in 2010.

== See also ==
- Defined contribution plan
- 401(k)
- 529 plan
- Nudge theory
- Behavioral economics
- Exchange-traded fund
- Stock fund
- Bond fund
- Money fund
- Income fund
- Lifestyling
