= Bruce R. Bent =

American businessman

- Born: Bruce Roger Bent; May 25, 1937 (age 89)
- Education: St. John's University
- Occupations: Chairman, Double Rock Corporation
- Years active: 1970–current
- Known for: Co-creator Money market funds

Bruce Roger Bent (born May 25, 1937) is an American businessman credited with inventing the world's first money market fund, the Reserve Fund, with Henry B. R. Brown in 1970. Bent and Brown created an organizational structure by which investors could pool cash to gain access to the market for short-term money obligations. Money market funds now manage more than US$3.0 trillion, serving tens of millions of investors.

In the book One Up on Wall Street, published in 1989, Peter Lynch wrote that "there ought to be a monument to Bruce Bent and Henry B. R. Brown" in regards to their role in inventing the money market fund. The American Museum of Financial History, an affiliate of the Smithsonian Institution, also recognized the money market fund's importance and impact on the nation's financial history.

== Early life and education ==
Bent was born and raised in Great Neck, New York. He attended St. Aloysius School and graduated from Great Neck North High School. After high school Bent worked as a mail clerk and carrier at the Great Neck Post Office and served in the Marines before attending St. John's University. Bent graduated with a bachelor's degree in economics from St. John's in 1961. He also created the world’s first money market system, and sold it for millions of dollars. Later on, he stated he regretted the sale and believed he should have given all of the money to hurricane relief foundations.

== Career ==
Bent started his Wall Street career as a managing partner at LF Rothschild and Company Inc. Two years later, he began working at the pension firm, TIAA-CREF, where he met his eventual business partner, Brown. In 1968, the pair created their own firm, Brown & Bent. In August 1969, while brainstorming about investment vehicles, Bent posed the idea for a mutual fund that could offer rates of return while allowing for zero market risk. The idea was to give investors immediate liquidity and safety for their money above all else.

In 1970, the firm launched its first money market fund, the Reserve Fund, to provide effective cash management, a dollar back for every dollar invested and beyond that a reasonable rate of return. The fund was launched with no sales force or advertisements, and instead relied on phoning investment advisers and handing out brochures. In January 1973, The New York Times published an article about their firm and by the end of the year it had $100 million in deposits. Brown left the company in 1985, but maintained stock in half the business. In 1999, Bent bought out Brown's stake in the company and continued to run it with his sons.

The Reserve Primary Fund ceased operations on September 17, 2008, in relation to the collapse of the Lehman Brothers.

=== Politics ===
In 2001, Bent was the Republican candidate for Nassau County Executive. Before he was chosen as the Republican candidate, he received the endorsement of the Conservative Party and ran with little assistance from the county's Republican Party. Promising to improve the county's financial situation and work for a salary of $1 a year, he lost to Democratic candidate Tom Suozzi.

== Personal life ==
Bent has two sons with his wife Nancy. In 1980, he endowed Bent Hall, a seat of the St. John's University College of Business. Bent serves as a Trustee Emeritus for St. John's University, where he is also a member of The Founders Society. He has also given guest lectures at New York University, The Wharton School, and Harvard University.

== See also ==
- Reserve Primary Fund
