= Money market fund =

Open-end mutual fund

A money market fund (also called a money market mutual fund) is an open-end mutual fund that invests in short-term debt securities such as US Treasury bills and commercial paper. Money market funds are managed with the goal of maintaining a highly stable asset value through liquid investments while paying income to investors in the form of dividends. Although they are not insured against loss, actual losses have been quite rare in practice.

Regulated in the United States under the Investment Company Act of 1940, and in Europe under Regulation 2017/1131, money market funds are important providers of liquidity to financial intermediaries.

== Explanation ==
Money market funds seek to limit exposure to losses due to credit, market, and liquidity risks. Money market funds in the United States are regulated by the Securities and Exchange Commission (SEC) under the Investment Company Act of 1940. Rule 2a-7 of the Act restricts the quality, maturity, and diversity of investments by money market funds. Under this act, a money fund mainly buys the highest-rated debt, which matures in under 13 months. The portfolio must maintain a weighted average maturity (WAM) of 60 days or less and not invest more than 5% in any one issuer, except for government securities and repurchase agreements.

Securities in which money markets may invest include commercial paper, repurchase agreements, short-term bonds, and other money funds. Money market securities must be highly liquid and of the highest quality.

== History ==
In 1971, Bruce R. Bent and Henry B. R. Brown established the first money market fund. It was named the Reserve Fund and was offered to investors who were interested in preserving their cash and earning a low rate of return. Several more funds were set up shortly after, and the market grew significantly over the following years. Money market funds are credited with popularizing mutual funds in general, which until that time were not widely utilized.

Money market funds in the United States created a solution to the limitations of Regulation Q, which at the time prohibited demand deposit accounts from paying interest and capped the rate of interest on other types of bank accounts at 5.25%. Thus, money market funds were created as a substitute for bank accounts.

In the 1990s, bank interest rates in Japan were near zero for an extended period. To search for higher yields from these low rates in bank deposits, investors used money market funds for short-term deposits instead. However, several money market funds fell short of their stable value in 2001 due to the bankruptcy of Enron, in which several Japanese funds had invested, and investors fled into government-insured bank accounts. Since then, the total value of money markets has remained low.

Money market funds in Europe have always had much lower levels of investment capital than in the United States or Japan. Regulations in the EU have always encouraged investors to use banks rather than money market funds for short-term deposits.

== Breaking the buck ==
Money market funds seek a stable net asset value (NAV) per share (generally $1.00 in the United States). They aim to never lose money. The $1.00 is maintained by declaring dividends to shareholders, typically daily, at an amount equal to the fund's net income. If a fund's NAV drops below $1.00, it is said that the fund “broke the buck”. Federal Reserve researchers have compared stablecoins to money market funds, finding that both may be vulnerable to runs and flight-to-safety dynamics during market stress. For SEC-registered money funds, maintaining the $1.00 flat NAV is usually accomplished under a provision under Rule 2a-7 of the Act that allows a fund to value its investments at amortized cost rather than market value, provided that certain conditions are maintained. One such condition involves a side-test calculation of the NAV that uses the market value of the fund's investments. The fund's published, amortized value may not exceed this market value by more than 1/2 cent per share, a comparison that is generally made weekly. If the variance does exceed $0.005 per share, the fund could be considered to have broken the buck, and regulators may force it into liquidation.

Buck breaking has rarely happened. Before the 2008 financial crisis, only three money funds had broken the buck in the 37-year history of money funds.

While money market funds are typically managed in a fairly safe manner, there would have been many more failures over this period if the companies offering the money market funds had not stepped in when necessary to support their fund (by way of infusing capital to reimburse security losses) and avoid having the funds break the buck. This was done because the expected cost to the business from allowing the fund value to drop—in lost customers and reputation—was greater than the amount needed to bail it out.

The first money market mutual fund to break the buck was First Multifund for Daily Income (FMDI) in 1978, liquidating and restating NAV at 94 cents per share. An argument has been made that FMDI was not technically a money market fund as, at the time of liquidation, the average maturity of securities in its portfolio exceeded two years. However, prospective investors were informed that FMDI would invest “solely in short-term (30-90 days) money market obligations.” Furthermore, the rule restricting the maturities that money market funds are permitted to invest in, Rule 2a-7 of the Investment Company Act of 1940, was not promulgated until 1983. Before the adoption of this rule, a mutual fund had to do little other than present itself as a money market fund, which FMDI did. Seeking a higher yield, FMDI had purchased increasingly longer-maturity securities, and rising interest rates negatively impacted the value of its portfolio. To meet increasing redemptions, the fund was forced to sell a certificate of deposit at a 3% loss, triggering a restatement of its NAV and the first instance of a money market fund “breaking the buck”.

The Community Bankers US Government Fund broke the buck in 1994, paying investors 96 cents per share. This was only the second failure in the then 23-year history of money funds, and there were no further failures for 14 years. The fund had invested a large percentage of its assets in adjustable-rate securities. As interest rates increased, these floating rate securities lost value. This fund was an institutional money fund, not a retail money fund, thus individuals were not directly affected.

A crisis occurred in 2007–2008, where the demand for asset-backed commercial paper dropped, causing the collapse of some structured investment vehicles. As a result, the Reserve Fund liquidated, paying shareholders 99.1 cents per share.

No further failures occurred until September 2008, a month that saw tumultuous events for money funds. However, as noted above, other failures were only averted by infusions of capital from the fund sponsors.

=== September 2008 ===
Money market funds increasingly became important to the wholesale money market leading up to the crisis. Their purchases of asset-backed securities and large-scale funding of foreign banks' short-term US-denominated debt put the funds in a pivotal position in the marketplace.

The week of September 15–19, 2008, was very turbulent for money funds and a key part of financial markets seizing up. On Monday, September 15, 2008, Lehman Brothers Holdings Inc. filed for bankruptcy. On the following day, the Reserve Primary Fund broke the buck when its shares fell to 97 cents after writing off debt issued by Lehman Brothers.

Continuing investor anxiety as a result of the Lehman Brothers bankruptcy and other pending financial troubles caused significant redemptions from money funds in general, as investors redeemed their holdings and funds were forced to liquidate assets or impose limits on redemptions. Through September 17, prime institutional funds saw substantial redemptions. Retail funds saw net inflows of $4 billion, for a net capital outflow from all funds of $169 billion to $3.4 trillion (5%).

In response, on September 19, the US Department of the Treasury announced an optional program to “insure the holdings of any publicly offered eligible money market mutual fund—both retail and institutional—that pays a fee to participate in the program.” The insurance guaranteed that if a covered fund had broken the buck, it would have been restored to $1 NAV. The program was similar to the FDIC, in that it insured deposit-like holdings and sought to prevent runs on the bank. The guarantee was backed by assets of the Treasury Department's Exchange Stabilization Fund, up to a maximum of $50 billion. This program only covered assets invested in funds before September 19, and those who sold equities, for example, during the subsequent market crash and parked their assets in money funds, were at risk. The program immediately stabilized the system and stanched the outflows, but drew criticism from banking organizations, including the Independent Community Bankers of America and American Bankers Association, who expected funds to drain out of bank deposits and into newly insured money funds, as these latter would combine higher yields with insurance. The guarantee program ended on September 18, 2009, after one year, with no losses and generated $1.2 billion (~$1.7 billion in 2024) in revenue from the participation fees.

==== Analysis ====
The crisis, which eventually became the catalyst for the Emergency Economic Stabilization Act of 2008, almost developed into a run on money funds: the redemptions caused a decline in demand for commercial paper, preventing companies from rolling over their short-term debt, potentially causing an acute liquidity crisis: if companies cannot issue new debt to repay maturing debt, and do not have cash on hand to pay it back, they will default on their obligations, and may have to file for bankruptcy. Thus there was concern that the run could cause extensive bankruptcies, a debt deflation spiral, and serious damage to the real economy, as in the Great Depression.

The decline in demand resulted in a “buyers strike,” as money funds could not (because of redemptions) or would not (because of fear of redemptions) buy commercial paper, driving yields up dramatically from around 2% the previous week to 8%, and funds put their money in Treasuries, driving their yields close to 0%.

This is a bank run in the sense that there is a mismatch in maturities, and thus a money fund is a “virtual bank”: the assets of money funds, while short-term, nonetheless typically have maturities of several months, while investors can request redemption at any time, without waiting for obligations to come due. Thus, if there is a sudden demand for redemptions, the assets may be liquidated in a fire sale, depressing their sale price.

== Statistics ==
The Investment Company Institute reports statistics on money funds weekly as part of its mutual fund statistics, as part of its industry statistics, including total assets and net flows, both for institutional and retail funds. It also provides annual reports in the ICI Fact Book.

At the end of 2011, there were 632 money market funds in operation, with total assets of nearly US$2.7 trillion. Of this $2.7 trillion, retail money market funds had $940 billion in Assets Under Management (AUM). Institutional funds had $1.75 trillion under management.

== Types and sizes of money funds ==
In the United States, the fund industry and its largest trade organization, the Investment Company Institute, generally categorize money funds into the type of investment strategy: prime, treasury, or tax-exempt, as well as distribution channel or investor category: institutional or retail.

=== Prime money fund ===
A fund that invests generally in variable-rate debt and commercial paper of corporations and securities of the US government and agencies can be considered any money fund that is not a treasury or tax-exempt fund.

=== Government and Treasury money funds ===
A Government money fund (as of the SEC's July 24, 2014, rule release) is one that invests at least 99.5% of its total assets in cash, government securities, and/or repurchase agreements that are “collateralized fully” (i.e., collateralized by cash or government securities). A Treasury fund is a type of government money fund that invests in US Treasury bills, bonds, and notes.

=== Tax-exempt money fund ===
The fund invests primarily in obligations of state and local jurisdictions (“municipal securities”) generally exempt from US Federal Income Tax (and to some extent state income taxes).

=== Institutional money fund ===
Institutional money funds are high minimum investment, low expense share classes that are marketed to corporations, governments, or fiduciaries. They are often set up so that money is swept to them overnight from a company's main operating accounts. Large national chains often have many accounts with banks across the country but electronically pull most funds on deposit with them to a concentrated money market fund.

=== Retail money fund ===
Retail money funds are offered primarily to individuals. Retail money market funds hold roughly 33% of all money market fund assets.

Fund yields are typically somewhat higher than bank savings accounts, however these are different products with differing risks (e.g., money fund accounts are not insured and are not deposit accounts). Since retail funds generally have higher servicing needs and thus expenses than institutional funds, their yields are generally lower than institutional funds.

SEC rule amendments released July 24, 2014, have 'improved' the definition of a retail money fund to be one that has policies and procedures reasonably designed to limit its shareholders to natural persons.

=== Money fund sizes ===
As of February 2025, total money market fund assets were $6.9 trillion, including $4.1 trillion held by institutional investors and nearly $2.8 trillion held by retail investors. The vast majority of those assets were held in government securities. Among the largest companies offering institutional money funds are JPmorgan, BlackRock, Western Asset, Federated Investors, Bank of America, Dreyfus, AIM and Evergreen (Wachovia). The largest retail money fund providers include: Fidelity, Vanguard, and Schwab.

== Similar investments ==
=== Money market accounts ===
Banks in the United States offer savings and money market deposit accounts, but these should not be confused with money mutual funds. These bank accounts offer higher yields than traditional passbook savings accounts, but often with higher minimum balance requirements and limited transactions. A money market account may refer to a money market mutual fund, a bank money market deposit account (MMDA), or a brokerage sweep free credit balance.

=== Ultrashort bond funds ===
Ultrashort bond funds are mutual funds, similar to money market funds, that, as the name implies, invest in bonds with extremely short maturities. Unlike money market funds, however, there are no restrictions on the quality of the investments they hold. Instead, ultrashort bond funds typically invest in riskier securities to increase their return. Since these high-risk securities can experience large swings in price or even default, ultrashort bond funds, unlike money market funds, do not seek to maintain a stable $1.00 NAV and may lose money or dip below the $1.00 mark in the short term. Finally, because they invest in lower-quality securities, ultrashort bond funds are more susceptible to adverse market conditions such as those brought on by the 2008 financial crisis.

=== Enhanced cash funds ===
Enhanced cash funds are bond funds similar to money market funds, in that they aim to provide liquidity and principal preservation, but which:

- Invest in a wider variety of assets and do not meet the restrictions of SEC Rule 2a-7;
- Aim for higher returns;
- Have less liquidity;
- Do not aim as strongly for stable NAV.

Enhanced cash funds will typically invest some of their portfolio in the same assets as money market funds, but others in riskier, higher-yielding, less liquid assets such as:

- Lower-rated bonds;
- Longer maturity;
- Foreign currency–denominated debt;
- Asset-backed commercial paper (ABCP);
- Mortgage-backed securities (MBSs);
- Structured investment vehicles (SIVs).

In general, the NAV will stay close to $1 but is expected to fluctuate above and below and will break the buck more often. Different managers place different emphases on risk versus return in enhanced cash—some consider preservation of principal as paramount, and thus take few risks, while others see these as more bond-like and an opportunity to increase yield without necessarily preserving principal. These are typically available only to institutional investors.

The purpose of enhanced cash funds is not to replace money markets but to fit in the continuum between cash and bonds—to provide a higher-yielding investment for more permanent cash. That is, within one's asset allocation, one has a continuum between cash and long-term investments:

- Cash—most liquid and least risky, but low yielding;
- Money markets/cash equivalents;
- Enhanced cash;
- Long-term bonds and other non-cash long-term investments—least liquid and most risky, but highest yielding.

Enhanced cash funds were developed due to low spreads in traditional cash equivalents.

There are also funds that are billed as “money market funds” but are not 2a-7 funds (do not meet the requirements of the rule). In addition to 2a-7 eligible securities, these funds invest in Eurodollars and repos (repurchase agreements), which are similarly liquid and stable to 2a-7 eligible securities but are not allowed under the regulations.

== Systemic risk and global regulatory reform ==
=== US regulatory reform ===
A deconstruction of the September 2008 events around money market funds and the resulting fear, panic, contagion, classic bank run, emergency need for substantial external propping up, etc., revealed that the US regulatory system covering the basic extension of credit has had substantial flaws that in hindsight date back at least two decades.

It has long been understood that regulation around the extension of credit requires substantial levels of integrity throughout the system. To the extent regulation can help ensure that base levels of integrity persist throughout the chain, from borrower to lender, and it curtails the overall extension of credit to reasonable levels, episodic financial crises may be averted.

In the 1970s, money market funds began disintermediating banks from their classic interposition between savers and borrowers. The funds provided a more direct link, with less overhead. Large banks are regulated by the Federal Reserve Board and the Office of the Comptroller of the Currency. Notably, the Fed is itself owned by the large private banks, and controls the overall supply of money in the United States. The OCC is housed within the Treasury Department, which in turn manages the issuance and maintenance of the multi-trillion dollar debt of the US government. The overall debt is of course connected to ongoing federal government spending vs. actual ongoing tax receipts. Unquestionably, the private banking industry, bank regulation, the national debt, and ongoing governmental spending politics are substantially interconnected. Interest rates incurred on the national debt are subject to rate setting by the Fed, and inflation (all else being equal) allows today's fixed debt obligation to be paid off in ever cheaper to obtain dollars. The third major bank regulator, designed to swiftly remove failing banks, is the Federal Deposit Insurance Corporation, a bailout fund and resolution authority that can eliminate banks that are failing, with minimum disruption to the banking industry itself. They also help ensure depositors continue to do business with banks after such failures by insuring their deposits.

From the outset, money market funds fell under the jurisdiction of the SEC as they appeared to be more like investments (most similar to traditional stocks and bonds) vs. deposits and loans (cash and cash equivalents the domain of the bankers). Although money market funds are quite close and are often accounted for as cash equivalents, their main regulator, the SEC, has zero mandate to control the supply of money, limit the overall extension of credit, mitigate against boom and bust cycles, etc. The SEC's focus remains on adequate disclosure of risk and honesty and integrity in financial reporting and trading markets. After adequate disclosure, the SEC adopts a hands-off, let-the-buyer-beware attitude.

To many retail investors, money market funds are confusingly similar to traditional bank demand deposits. Virtually all large money market funds offer check writing, ACH transfers, wiring of funds, associated debit and credit cards, detailed monthly statements of all cash transactions, copies of canceled checks, etc. This makes it appear that cash is actually in the individual's account. With net asset values reported flat at $1.00, despite the market value variance of the actual underlying assets, an impression of rock-solid stability is maintained. To help maintain this impression, money market fund managers frequently forgo being reimbursed legitimate fund expenses or cut their management fee on an ad hoc and informal basis to maintain that solid appearance of stability.

To illustrate the various blending and blurring of functions between classic banking and investing activities at money market funds, a simplified example will help. Imagine only retail “depositors” on one end and S&P 500 corporations borrowing through the commercial paper market on the other. The depositors assume:

- Extremely short duration (60 days or less)
- Extremely broad diversification (hundreds, if not thousands of positions)
- Very high-grade investments.

After 10–20 years of stability, depositors assume safety and place all cash in money markets, earning higher interest rates.

On the borrowing side, after a period of 10 to 20 years, corporations within the S&P 500 become highly familiar with securing funds through money markets, which are characterized by their stability. Initially, these corporations may have utilized these markets primarily for seasonal cash requirements, acting as net borrowers for approximately 90 days each year. They would engage in borrowing during periods of significant cash needs throughout their operating cycles to temporarily finance short-term increases in inventory and receivables. Additionally, some corporations transitioned to this funding avenue from previous bank revolving lines of credit, which were readily available but required maintenance of a zero balance for at least 60 days each year. In such scenarios, these corporations typically had adequate equity and debt financing to meet their regular capital requirements. However, they remained reliant on the availability of these funding sources on an immediate, daily basis.

Over time, money market fund “depositors” perceived their holdings as low-risk and stable. Likewise, corporations viewed the interest rates as attractive and easy to constantly roll over short-term commercial paper. Rollovers enabled corporations to fund longer and longer-term obligations via the money markets. The net effect was an expansion of credit. This arrangement creates a scenario of long-term borrowing on one end, funded by an on-demand depositor on the other, effectively resulting in an underlying maturity mismatch.

Following the crisis, two solutions have been proposed. One, repeatedly supported over the long term by the GAO and others, is to consolidate the US financial industry regulators. A step along this line has been the creation of the Financial Stability Oversight Council to address systemic risk issues that have, in the past, as illustrated by the money market fund crisis above, fallen neatly between the cracks of the standing isolated financial regulators. Proposals to merge the SEC and CFTC have also been made.

A second solution, more focused on money market funds directly, is to re-regulate them to address the common misunderstandings and to ensure that money market “depositors,” who enjoy greater interest rates, thoroughly understand the actual risk they are undertaking. These risks include substantial interconnectedness between and among money market participants and various other substantial systemic risks factors.

One solution is to report to money market “depositors” the actual, floating net asset value. This disclosure has come under strong opposition by Fidelity Investments, The Vanguard Group, BlackRock, and the US Chamber of Commerce as well as others.

The SEC would normally be the regulator to address the risks to investors taken by money market funds; however, to date, the SEC has been internally politically gridlocked. The SEC is controlled by five commissioners, no more than three of whom may be from the same political party. They are also strongly enmeshed with the current mutual fund industry and are largely divorced from traditional banking industry regulation. As such, the SEC is not concerned over overall credit extension, money supply, or bringing shadow banking under the regulatory umbrella of effective credit regulation.

As the SEC was gridlocked, the Financial Stability Oversight Council promulgated its own suggested money market reforms and threatens to move forward if the SEC doesn't button it up with an acceptable solution of their own on a timely basis. The SEC has argued vociferously that this is “their area” and FSOC should back off and let them handle it, a viewpoint shared by four former SEC chairmen, Roderick Hills, David Ruder, Richard Breeden, and Harvey Pitt, and two former commissioners, Roel Campos and Paul S. Atkins.

=== US Reform: SEC Rule Amendments released July 24, 2014 ===
The Securities and Exchange Commission (SEC) issued final rules that are designed to address money funds’ susceptibility to heavy redemptions in times of stress, improve their ability to manage and mitigate potential contagion from such redemptions, and increase the transparency of their risks, while preserving, as much as possible, their benefits.

There are several key components:

Floating NAV required of institutional non-government money funds

The SEC is removing the valuation exemption that permitted these funds (whose investors historically have made the heaviest redemptions in times of stress) to maintain a stable NAV, i.e., they will have to transact sales and redemptions as a market value-based or “floating” NAV, rounded to the fourth decimal place (e.g., $1.0000).

Fees and gates

The SEC is giving money fund boards of directors the discretion to impose a liquidity fee if a fund's weekly liquidity level falls below the required regulatory threshold and/or to suspend redemptions temporarily, i.e., to “gate” funds, under the same circumstances. These amendments will require all non-government money funds to impose a liquidity fee if the fund's weekly liquidity level falls below a designated threshold, unless the fund's board determines that imposing such a fee is not in the best interests of the fund.

Other provisions

In addition, the SEC is adopting amendments designed to make money market funds more resilient by increasing the diversification of their portfolios, enhancing their stress testing, and improving transparency by requiring money market funds to report additional information to the SEC and to investors. Additionally, stress testing will be required, and a key focus will be placed on the fund's ability to maintain weekly liquid assets of at least 10%. Finally, the amendments require investment advisers to certain large unregistered liquidity funds, which can have many of the same economic features as money market funds, to provide additional information about those funds to the SEC.

=== EU regulatory reform ===
In parallel with the US Reform, the EU completed drafting a similar regulation for the money market fund product.

On June 30, 2017, Regulation (EU) 2017/1131 for money market funds was published in the Official Journal of the European Union, introducing new rules for MMFs domiciled, managed, or marketed in the European Union. This entered into effect in March 2019. The regulation introduces four new categories of fund structures for MMFs:

- Public Debt Constant Net Asset Value (CNAV) MMFs are short-term MMFs. Funds must invest 99.5% in government assets. Units in the fund are purchased or redeemed at a constant price rounded to the nearest percentage point.
- Low Volatility Net Asset Value (LVNAV) MMFs are short-term MMFs. Funds around are purchased or redeemed at a constant price so long as the value of the underlying assets does not deviate by more than 0.2% (20 bps) from par (i.e., 1.00).
- Short-Term Variable NAV – Short-term Variable Net Asset Value (VNAV) MMFs are primarily invested in money market instruments, deposits, and other MMFs. Funds are subject to looser liquidity rules than Public Debt CNAV and LVNAV funds. Units in the funds are purchased or redeemed at a variable price calculated to the equivalent of at least four significant figures (e.g., 10,000.00).
- Standard Variable NAV VNAV– Standard MMFs must be VNAV funds. Funds are primarily invested in money market instruments, deposits, and other short-term assets. Funds are subject to looser liquidity rules than Public Debt CNAV and LVNAV funds and may invest in assets of much longer maturity. Units in the funds are purchased or redeemed at a variable price calculated to the equivalent of at least four significant figures (e.g., 10,000.00).

Although the starting products were similar, there are now considerable differences between US and EU MMFs. Whilst EU MMF investors mostly moved to successor fund types, investors in US MMFs undertook a huge and persisting switch from Prime into Government MMF.

The EU MMF Regulation does not make any reference to either fund or portfolio external credit rating requirements. Throughout the transition, EU MMFs overwhelmingly retained their existing ratings, and the credit rating agencies have confirmed their commitment to the MMF-specific rating criteria they each maintain.

A major difference in scope is that, on a like-for-like basis, US MMFs may be compared only to EU short-term MMFs.

== See also ==
- Bond fund
- Income fund
- Money market
- Money supply
- Shadow banking system
- Stable value fund
- Stock fund
- Sweep account
- Target date fund
