= Renaissance Technologies =

American quantitative hedge fund

Renaissance Technologies LLC
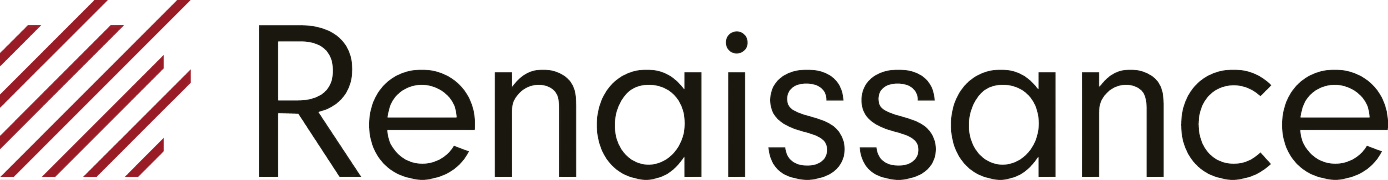
- Formerly: Monemetrics (1978–1982)
- Type: Private
- Industry: Financial services
- Genre: Hedge fund
- Founded: 1978; 48 years ago
- Founders: James H. Simons; Howard L. Morgan
- Headquarters: East Setauket, New York, U.S.
- Key people: Peter Fitzhugh Brown (CEO); Robert Mercer
- Products: Medallion Fund; Institutional Equities Fund; Institutional Diversified Alpha; Institutional Diversified Global Equities
- AUM: US$130 billion (as of 19 April 2021)
- Number of employees: 310 (2021)
- Website: rentec.com

Renaissance Technologies LLC (also known as RenTec or RenTech) is an American hedge fund based in East Setauket, New York, on Long Island, that specializes in systematic trading using quantitative models derived from mathematical and statistical analysis. Renaissance originated as Monemetrics, founded in 1978 by mathematician and former Cold War codebreaker Jim Simons, and adopted its current name in 1982.

In 1988, the firm established the Medallion Fund, a form of Leonard Baum's mathematical models expanded by algebraist James Ax, to explore correlations from which it could profit. The hedge fund was named Medallion in honor of the math awards Simons and Ax had won.

Simons ran Renaissance until his retirement in late 2009, when he was succeeded by Peter Brown and Robert Mercer. He continued to play a role at the firm as non-executive chairman until 2021. He remained invested in its funds, particularly the Medallion fund, until his death in 2024. The company is now run by Brown (after Mercer resigned). Both were computer scientists specializing in computational linguistics who joined Renaissance in 1993 from IBM Research. The fund has $165 billion in discretionary assets under management (including leverage) as of April 2021.

== Academia and research ==
James Simons founded Renaissance Technologies following a decade as the chair of the Department of Mathematics at Stony Brook University. Simons in 1976 was a recipient of the Oswald Veblen Prize of the American Mathematical Society. He is known in the scientific community for co-developing the Chern–Simons theory, which is used in modern theoretical physics.

== Quantitative trading ==
The firm uses quantitative trading, where staff tap data in its petabyte-scale data warehouse to assess statistical probabilities for the direction of securities prices in any given market. Staff attribute the breadth of data on events peripheral to financial and economic phenomena that Renaissance takes into account, and the firm's ability to manipulate large amounts of data by deploying scalable technological architectures for computation and execution.

Renaissance Technologies' hedge fund has employed mathematical models to analyze and execute trades, many of them automated. The firm uses computer-based models to predict price changes in easily traded financial instruments. These models are based on analyzing as much data as can be gathered, then looking for non-random movements to make predictions. Some also attribute the firm's performance to employing financial signal processing techniques such as pattern recognition. The book The Quants describes the hiring of speech recognition experts, many from IBM, including the current leaders of the firm.

== "Quants" with non-financial background ==
Renaissance employs specialists with non-financial backgrounds, including computer scientists, mathematicians, physicists, signal processing experts and statisticians. The firm's latest fund is the Renaissance Institutional Equities Fund (RIEF). RIEF has historically trailed the firm's better-known Medallion fund, a separate fund that contains only the personal money of the firm's executives.

Renaissance is a firm run by and for scientists, employing those with non-financial backgrounds for quantitative finance research like mathematicians, statisticians, theoretical and experimental physicists, astronomers, and computer scientists. According to a piece in The New York Times, "Wall Street experience is frowned on and a flair for science is prized." One former employee speculated that the herdlike mentality among business school graduates is to blame for poor investor returns. Renaissance engages roughly 150 researchers and computer programmers, half of whom have PhDs in scientific disciplines, at its 50-acre East Setauket campus in Long Island, New York, which is near the State University of New York at Stony Brook. Mathematician Isadore Singer referred to Renaissance's East Setauket office as the best physics and mathematics department in the world.

The firm's administrative and back-office functions are handled from its Manhattan office in New York City. The firm is secretive about the workings of its business and very little is known about them. The firm is known for low personnel turnover and for requiring its researchers to agree to intellectual property obligations by signing non-compete and non-disclosure agreements.

== Monemetrics ==
In 1978, Simons left academia and started a hedge fund management firm called Monemetrics in a Long Island strip mall. The firm primarily traded currencies at the start. It did not occur to Simons at first to apply mathematics to his business, but he gradually realized that it should be possible to make mathematical models of the data he was collecting.

Monemetrics' name was changed to Renaissance Technologies in 1982. Simons started recruiting some of the mathematicians and data-modeling types from his days at the Institute for Defense Analysis (IDA) and Stony Brook University. His first recruit was Leonard Baum, a cryptanalyst from IDA who was also the co-author of the Baum–Welch algorithm. When Baum abandoned the idea of trading with mathematical models and took to fundamental trading, Simons brought in algebraist James Ax from Cornell University. Ax expanded Baum's models for trading currencies to cover any commodity future and subsequently Simons set up Ax with his own trading account, Axcom Ltd., which eventually gave birth to the profitable fund — Medallion. During the 1980s, Ax and his researchers improved on Baum's models and used them to explore correlations from which they could profit.

=== Medallion Fund ===
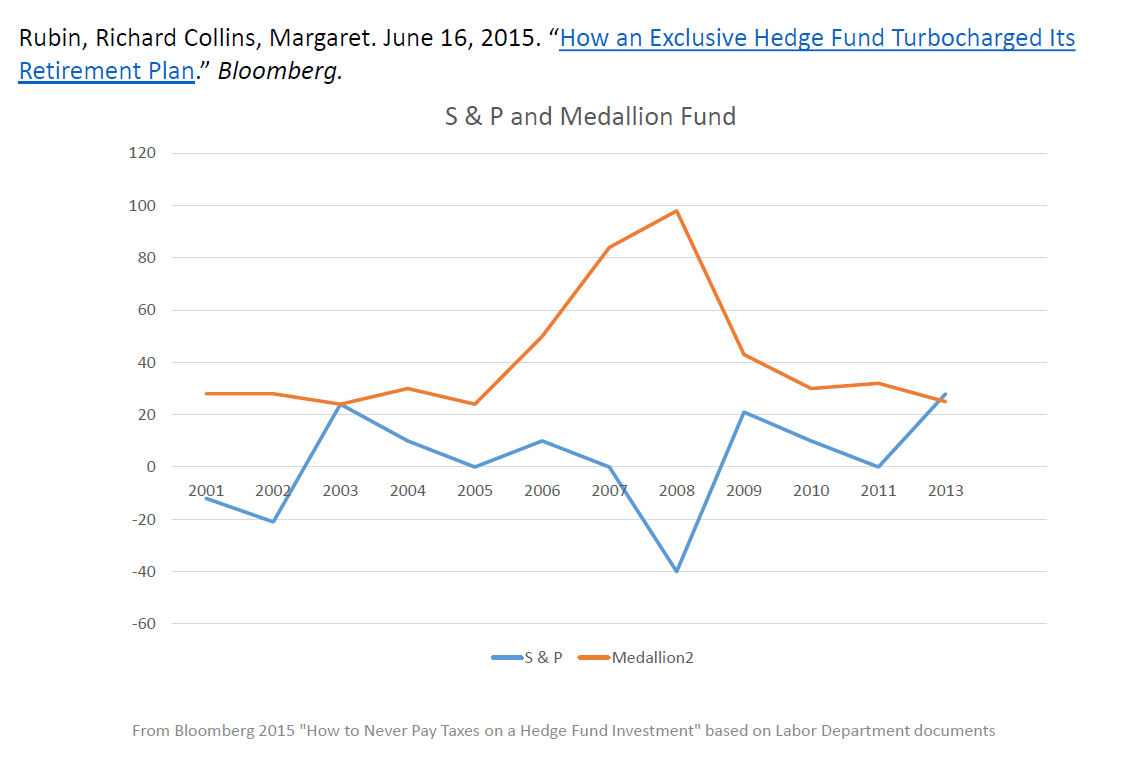
Medallion outperformed their old pre-2010 401(k) plan and S&P

"From 2001 through 2013, the fund’s worst year was a 21 percent gain, after subtracting fees. Medallion reaped a 98.2 percent gain in 2008, the year the Standard & Poor’s 500 Index lost 38.5 percent."

— Rubin and Collins. June 16, 2015. Bloomberg

In 1988, Renaissance established its most profitable fund, the Medallion fund (previously the Limroy Colombian fund), which used an expanded form of Leonard Baum's mathematical models improved by algebraist James Ax to explore correlations from which they could profit. Simons and Ax, who were classmates at UC Berkeley, started Medallion, which they named after their awards in mathematics. The initial success of the company's models led Simons to base the fund's trades entirely on the models.

By April 1989, however, peak-to-trough losses had mounted to about 30%. Ax claimed to have accounted for such a decline in his models and insisted on continuing to trade. Simons wanted to pause and reevaluate; Simons, as majority owner, prevailed, and Ax departed. Simons then asked Berkeley professor Elwyn Berlekamp to run Medallion. A consultant for Axcom whom Simons had first met at the IDA, Berlekamp had acquired most of Ax's stake in Axcom and became its CEO. He worked with Sandor Straus, Jim Simons and another consultant, Henry Laufer, to overhaul Medallion's trading system over the course of six months. In 1990, Berlekamp led Medallion to a 55.9% gain, net of fees, and then returned to his duties as a Berkeley professor after selling out to Simons at six times the price for which he had bought his Axcom interests sixteen months earlier. Straus then took Berlekamp's place, running Medallion's revamped trading system, which returned 39.4% in 1991, 34% in 1992 and 39.1% in 1993, according to Medallion annual reports.

The Medallion fund is considered to be one of the most successful hedge funds ever. From 1994 through mid-2014, it averaged a 71.8% annual return, before fees. The fund has been closed to outside investors since 1993 and is available only to current and past employees and their families. The firm bought out the last investor in the Medallion fund in 2005 and the investor community has not seen its returns since then. About 100 of Renaissance's some 275 employees are "qualified purchasers", meaning they generally have at least $5 million in assets to invest. The remaining are "accredited investors", generally worth at least $1 million.

"Since 1988, his flagship Medallion fund has generated average annual returns of 66% before charging hefty investor fees—39% after fees—racking up trading gains of more than $100 billion. No one in the investment world comes close. Warren Buffett, George Soros, Peter Lynch, Steve Cohen, and Ray Dalio all fall short."

— ‘The Man Who Solved the Market: How Jim Simons Launched the Quant Revolution’ by Gregory Zuckerman 2019

By 2000, the computer-driven Medallion fund had an average annual return of 34% after fees from its 1988 inception. Simons ran Renaissance until his retirement in late 2009. Between January 1993 and April 2005, Medallion only had 17 losing months and out of 49 quarters over the same period, Medallion had only three losing quarters. Between 1989-2005 Medallion had only one year showing a loss: 1989.

During 2020 the Medallion fund surged 76%.

=== Medallion as a retirement fund ===
"[Renaissance] won the [Labor Department]'s permission to put pieces of Medallion inside Roth IRAs. That means no taxes – ever – on the future earnings of a fund that averaged a 71.8 percent annual return, before fees, from 1994 through mid-2014."

— Rubin and Collins. June 16, 2015. Bloomberg

Renaissance Technologies terminated its 401(k) retirement plan in 2010 and employees' account balances were put into Individual Retirement Accounts. Contributions could be made to a standard Individual Retirement Accounts and then converted to a Roth IRA regardless of income. By 2012, Renaissance was granted a special exemption by the United States Labor Department allowing employees to invest their retirement money in Medallion arguing that Medallion had consistently outperformed their old 401(k) plan. In 2013, Renaissance's IRA plans had 259 participants whose $86.6 million contribution grew to $153 million that year without fees or annual taxes. Renaissance set up a new 401(k) plan, and in November 2014 the Labor Department allowed that plan to be invested in Medallion as well.

=== Renaissance Institutional Equities Fund (RIEF) ===
In 2005, Renaissance Institutional Equities Fund (RIEF) was created. RIEF has historically trailed the firm's better-known Medallion fund, a separate fund that only contains the personal money of the firm's executives. In April 2020, Institutional Investor reported that the disparity between Renaissance's Medallion fund and other funds, including RIEF, was approximately 17-19%. Renaissance also offers two Renaissance Institutional Diversified Alpha (RIDA) to outsiders. Simons ran Renaissance until his retirement in late 2009. Renaissance Institutional Equities Fund had difficulty with the higher volatility environment that persisted throughout the end of the summer of 2007. According to an article in Bloomberg in August 2007,

"James Simons's $29 billion Renaissance Institutional Equities Fund fell 8.7% in August 2007 when his computer models used to buy and sell stocks were overwhelmed by securities' price swings. The two-year-old quantitative, or 'quant', hedge fund now has declined 7.4 percent for the year. Simons said other hedge funds have been forced to sell positions, short-circuiting statistical models based on the relationships among securities."

— Bloomberg 2007

RIEF once again struggled in the high volatility environment of 2020. According to an article in Bloomberg in November 2020,

Renaissance saw a decline of about 20% through October in its long-biased fund, according to a person familiar with the matter. The $75 billion firm’s market-neutral fund dropped about 27% and its global-equities fund lost about 25%... The firm, founded by former codebreaker Jim Simons, told investors that its losses are due to being under-hedged during March’s collapse and then over-hedged in the rebound from April through June. That happened because models that had “overcompensated” for the original trouble. “It is not surprising that our funds, which depend on models that are trained on historical data, should perform abnormally (either for the better or for the worse) in a year that is anything but normal by historical standards,” Renaissance told clients in a September letter seen by Bloomberg.

— Bloomberg 2020

From 1 December 2020 to 1 February 2021, according to Bloomberg, clients (LPs) had withdrawn $5 billion from the fund.

On 25 September 2008, Renaissance wrote a comment letter to the Securities and Exchange Commission, discouraging them from implementing a rule change that would have permitted the public to access information regarding institutional investors' short positions, as they can currently do with long positions. The company cited a number of reasons for this, including the fact that "institutional investors may alter their trading activity to avoid public disclosure".

== Governmental affairs ==
=== 2014 tax avoidance investigation ===
In July 2014, Renaissance Technologies was included in a larger investigation undertaken by Carl Levin and the Permanent Subcommittee on Investigations on tax evasion by wealthy individuals. The focus of the tax avoidance investigation was Renaissance's trading strategy — which involved transactions with banks such as Barclays Plc and Deutsche Bank AG — through which profits converted from rapid trading were converted into lower-taxed, long-term capital gains. The strategy was also questioned by the Internal Revenue Service (IRS). The higher rates for the five years under investigation would have been 44.4 percent, as compared to 35 percent, whereas the lower rate was 15 percent, as compared to 23.8 percent.

The IRS contend[ed] that the arrangement Renaissance’s Medallion fund had with the banks, in which the fund owned option contracts rather than the underlying financial instruments, is a ruse and that the fund investors owe taxes at the higher rate. Because Medallion could claim that it owned just one asset – the option – and held it for more than a year, investors could declare their gains to be long-term investments.

— Bloomberg 2014

In September 2021, Simons, Mercer, and other Renaissance executives agreed to pay up to $7 billion in taxes and penalties to settle the dispute with the IRS. The settlement was among the largest in history.

=== Campaign contributions ===
According to OpenSecrets, Renaissance was the top financial firm contributing to federal campaigns in the 2016 election cycle, donating $33,108,000 by July. By comparison, over that same period sixth ranked Soros Fund Management has contributed $13,238,551. Renaissance's managers were also active in the 2016 cycle, contributing nearly $30 million by June, with Mercer ranking as the #1 individual federal donor, largely to Republicans, and Simons ranked #5, largely to Democrats. They were top donors to the presidential campaigns of Hillary Clinton and Donald Trump.

During the 2016 campaign cycle, Simons contributed $26,277,450, ranking as the 5th-largest individual contributor. Simons directed all but $25,000 of his funds towards liberal candidates. Robert Mercer contributed $25,059,300, ranking as the 7th-largest individual contributor. Robert Mercer directed all funds contributed towards conservative candidates.

Between 1990 and 2016, Renaissance employees have contributed $59,081,152 to federal campaigns and since 2001 have spent $3,730,000 on lobbying.

=== Millennium Management dispute ===
In December 2003, Renaissance sued rival firm Millennium Management after it hired former Renaissance employees Pavel Volfbeyn and Alexander Belopolsky. Jim Simons allegedly demanded the Millennium founder Israel Englander fire the two in 2007. In August 2007, Millennium agreed to fire both Volfbeyn and Belopolsky and pay US$20 million back to Renaissance, though they reportedly generated US$100 million in profits while working for Millennium.

== See also ==
- High-frequency trading
- Quote stuffing
- Winton Group
- D. E. Shaw & Co.
- PDT Partners
- Two Sigma Investments
- Flash Boys
- Dark liquidity
- Algorithmic trading
