= Reserve Primary Fund =

Money market fund

The Reserve Primary Fund was the original money market fund, created in 1970 by Bruce R. Bent and Henry B. R. Brown and managed by Reserve Management Company. At its peak it held more than $60 billion in assets. During the 2008 financial crisis, it lost dollar value, or "broke the buck," and was liquidated as a result.

== History ==
=== Origin ===
Until 1980, Federal Reserve Regulation Q limited the rate of interest that banks could pay on savings accounts to 5 percent. This rule was a legacy of the Great Depression, when unsustainable interest rates had contributed to widespread bank failures. When inflation reached 5 percent in 1969, depositors could no longer receive a beneficial real rate of interest. Alternatives to savings accounts at the time included Treasury bills and jumbo certificates of deposit, each of which paid market interest rates but were less liquid than savings accounts and had minimum purchase amounts of $10,000 or more. Seeing an opportunity for arbitrage, Bent and Brown established the Reserve Fund to pool funds and invest them solely in those instruments. In response to this and other arbitrage methods, Congress lifted most of the interest rate limits by 1986.

=== Failure ===
In 2006, Reserve Primary made the decision to purchase commercial paper, an asset class that Bent had dismissed as recently as 2001. By early 2008, asset-backed and financial-sector commercial paper made up 56% of its portfolio. The September 15, 2008 bankruptcy of Lehman Brothers raised concern about Reserve Primary's holdings of Lehman-issued paper, which then made up 1.2% of its portfolio, as well as its other financial-sector paper. Among money market funds, Reserve Primary was especially vulnerable due to its lack of a parent company that might be able to guarantee its share price. Demands to withdraw money from the fund reached 25% of its assets by the afternoon and more than half on the following day, as clients sought to exit the fund before its Lehman assets impacted the share price. Unable to find a buyer for the assets, the fund declared them worthless and announced a share price of $0.97. After the Reserve Primary announcement other money market funds also began to experience runs, leading the United States Treasury to halt orders and temporarily guarantee fund share prices. At the end of the month, the fund's managers announced that they would liquidate the fund.

The Securities and Exchange Commission (SEC) sued Reserve Management and its executives for making false assurances to investors about their ability to maintain the fund's value. A federal court awarded the SEC $750,000 from all parties, a small fraction of the requested damages. The court concluded that the misconduct had been an isolated incident in extraordinary circumstances and was not likely to be repeated. A separate investor class action lawsuit was settled for $54 million.

The fund dissolved in December 2015, having paid investors $0.991 per share.
