= Barbara Simons =

American computer scientist

Barbara B. Simons
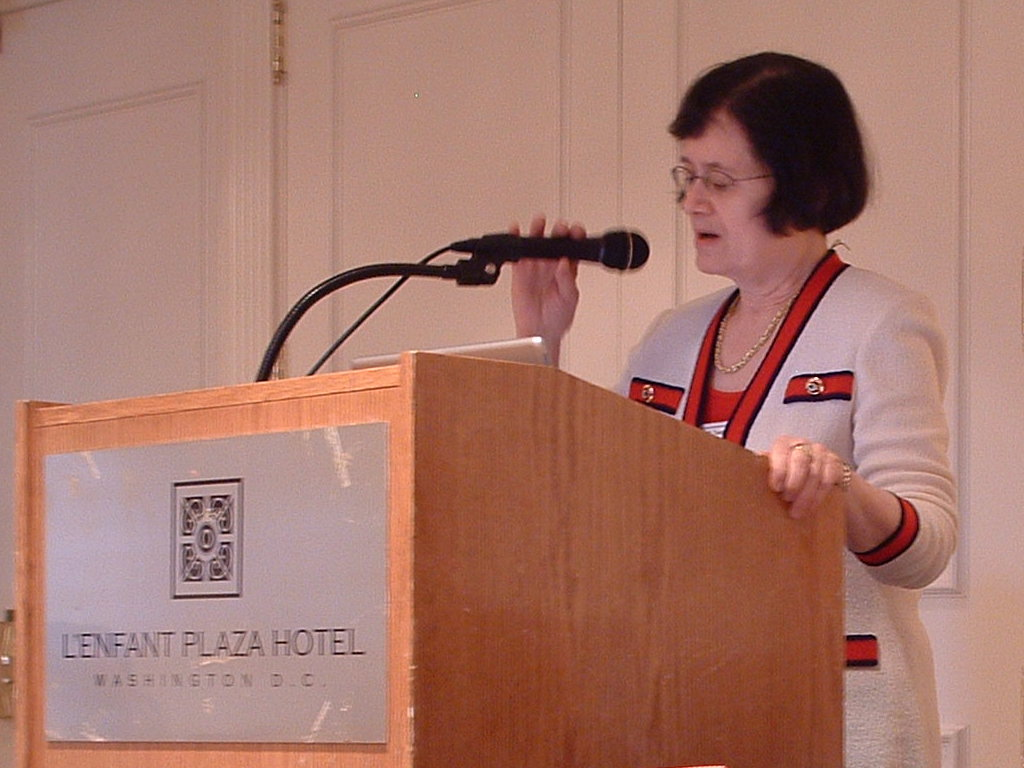
- Born: January 26, 1941 (age 85); Boston, Massachusetts, U.S.
- Education: University of California, Berkeley
- Known for: voting technology election security information security
- Spouse: Jim Simons (m. 1959; div. 1974)
- Scientific career
- Fields: Computer science
- Workplaces: IBM
- Doctoral advisor: Richard M. Karp

Barbara Bluestein Simons (born January 26, 1941) is an American computer scientist and the former president of the Association for Computing Machinery (ACM). She is a Ph.D. graduate of the University of California, Berkeley and spent her early career working as an IBM researcher. She is the founder and former co-chair of USACM, the ACM U.S. Public Policy Council. Her main areas of research are compiler optimization, scheduling theory and algorithm analysis and design.

Simons has worked for technology regulation since 2002, where she advocates for the end of electronic voting. She subsequently serves as the chairperson of the Verified Voting Foundation and coauthored a book on the flaws of electronic voting entitled Broken Ballots, with Douglas W. Jones.

== Early life ==
Simons was born in Boston, Massachusetts and grew up in Cincinnati, Ohio. In high school, she developed an interest for math and science while taking A.P. Math classes. She attended Wellesley College for a year, before moving to California in 1959 to resume her undergraduate education at Berkeley. There, she married James Harris Simons. At the beginning of her junior year she gave birth to a daughter, Liz, and dropped out of Berkeley shortly thereafter to become a mother and a housewife. In this time she decided to pursue a profession in Computer Programming, and began taking computer science classes part-time, before enrolling in graduate school at Stony Brook University. After a year of graduate school there, she and James Harris Simons divorced in 1974.

Simons transferred back to Berkeley for the remainder of graduate school, where she concentrated on studying scheduling theory and helped co-found the Women in Computer Science and Engineering club (WiCSE). In 1981, she received her Ph.D. in Computer Science. She received a Distinguished Engineering Alumni Award from Berkeley's College of Engineering.

== Career ==
1981-1998: IBM

After leaving the Berkeley in 1981, Simons began her career at Research Division of IBM in their Research Division in San Jose. There, she worked on compiler optimization, algorithm analysis, and clock synchronization, which she won an IBM Research Division Award for. In 1992, she began working as a senior programmer in IBM's Applications Development Technology Institute and subsequently as a senior technology adviser for IBM Global Services.

Over the course of her career at IBM, her interests shifted from research to the policy and regulation of technology. She took early retirement from IBM in 1998 after spending 17 years with the company.

1993-2002: ACM

After leaving IBM in 1998, Simons served as president of the Association for Computing Machinery (ACM), the largest computing society in the world, until 2000. She joined ACM when her career focus shifted from computing research to the politics of technology legislation. Prior to becoming the ACM president, Simons founded ACM's US Public Policy Committee (USACM) in 1993. She co-chaired this committee along with the ACM Committee for Scientific Freedom and Human Rights for 9 years. As president, she co-chaired the ACM study of statewide databases of voters in 1999 under President Clinton, called Voter Registration Databases 2000–2002. In 1999 she was elected secretary of the Council of Scientific Society Presidents (CSSP) as ACM President. In 2001 after her time as president, she received ACM's Outstanding Contribution Award. She is still a Fellow of ACM and the American Association for the Advancement of Science.

2008–Present: The Verified Voting Foundation

Since 2008, Simons has served on the board of directors of the Verified Voting Foundation, a non-partisan and non-profit organization that advocates for legislation to promote the safest and most transparent voting. The group's goals are to ensure that states and municipalities across America adopt voting technology best practices.

=== Other work ===
Simons helped found the Reentry Program for Women and Minorities at U.C. Berkeley in the Computer Science Department. She also serves on the boards of the Coalition to Diversify Computing (CDC) and the Berkeley Foundation for Opportunities in Information Technology (BFOIT), both which promote minorities to learn and work in computing.

In 2005 Simons became the first woman ever to receive the Distinguished Engineering Alumni Award from the U.C. Berkeley's College of Engineering.

She is a member of the board of directors at the U.C. Berkeley Engineering Fund, the Electronic Privacy Information Center, and sits on the Advisory Boards of the Oxford Internet Institute.

== Voting technology policy ==
After leaving IBM and serving as ACM president, Simons began working to reverse the dangers of using unverifiable technology in voting. In 2001 she participated in the National Workshop on Internet Voting under President Clinton, where she helped produce a report on Internet voting. She subsequently served on the President's Export Council's Subcommittee on Encryption, as well as on the Information Technology-Sector of the President's Council on the Year 2000 Conversion. Barbara held one of her first public outcries of unverifiable voting technology in 2003 because election officials in Silicon Valley wanted to switch to paperless machines. Now, Barbara serves as a board chair at Verified Voting. She also co-chaired the ACM study of statewide databases of registered voters alongside Paula Hawthorn. She participated on the Security Peer Review Group for the US Department of Defense’s Internet voting project (SERVE) and co-authored the report that led to the cancellation of SERVE because of security concerns 2004.

In addition to serving on the Board of Directors of the Verified Voting Foundation, Simons has worked for legislation to remove paperless voting machines and published various work about it. She played a key role in changing the League of Women Voters support and use of paperless voting. Initially the League had seen electronic voting as better for disabled people, then endorsed voting machines that are "recountable" after Simons. In 2008 she was appointed by Senator Harry Reid to the U.S Election Assistance Commission Board of Advisors, where she contributed to "Help America Vote Act" (HAVA). In 2009 she co-authored the League of Women Voters report on election auditing. With fellow computer scientist Douglas Jones, she co-authored a book about electronic voting machines in 2012, titled Broken Ballots: Will Your Vote Count?. Following this, in July 2015 she published another report about electronic voting for the U.S. Vote Foundation entitled The Future of Voting: End-to-End Verifiable Internet Voting.

== Awards and honors ==
- CPSR Norbert Wiener Award for Professional and Social Responsibility in Computing (1992)
- Featured by Science in a special edition on women in science (1992)
- ACM Fellow (1993)
- American Association for the Advancement of Science Fellow (1993)
- Named by Open Computing as one of the top 100 women in computing
- Selected by CNET as one of 26 Internet "Visionaries" (1995)
- Electronic Frontier Foundation Pioneer Award (1998)
- U.C. Berkeley Computer Science Department Distinguished Alumnus Award in Computer Science and Engineering (2000)
- ACM Outstanding Contribution Award (2002)
- Computing Research Association Distinguished Service Award (2004)
- University of California, Berkeley College of Engineering Distinguished Engineering Alumni Award (2005)
- U.C. Berkeley Lifetime Achievement Award (2005)
- U.S. Election Assistance Commission Board of Advisors (2008)
- WITI@UC Anthea Award (2019)
- ACM Policy Award (2019)
- Award by Verified Voting Foundation, for her dedication to election integrity
