= Stock fund =

Investment fund for the asset of stocks

A stock fund, or equity fund, is a fund that invests in stocks, also called equity securities. Stock funds can be contrasted with bond funds and money funds. Fund assets are typically mainly in stock, with some amount of cash, which is generally quite small, as opposed to bonds, notes, or other securities. This may be a mutual fund or exchange-traded fund. The objective of an equity fund is long-term growth through capital gains, although historically dividends have also been an important source of total return. Specific equity funds may focus on a certain sector of the market or may be geared toward a certain level of risk.

Stock funds can be distinguished by several properties. Funds may have a specific style, for example, value or growth. Funds may invest in solely the securities from one country, or from many countries. Funds may focus on some size of company, that is, small-cap, large-cap, et cetera. Funds which involve some component of stock picking are said to be actively managed, whereas index funds try as closely as possible to mirror specific stock market indices.

== Fund types ==
=== Index fund ===
Index funds invest in securities to mirror a market index, such as the S&P 500. An index fund buys and sells securities in a manner that mirrors the composition of the selected index. The fund's performance tracks the underlying index's performance. The turnover of securities in an index fund's portfolio is minimal. As a result, an index fund generally has lower management costs than other types of funds.

=== Growth fund ===
A growth fund invests in the stock of companies that are growing rapidly. Growth companies tend to reinvest all or most of their profits for research and development rather than pay dividends. Growth funds are focused on generating capital gains rather than income.

=== Value fund ===
This is a fund that invests in "value" stocks. Companies rated as value stocks usually are older, established businesses that pay dividends.

=== Sector fund ===
A fund that invests in one area of industry is called a sector fund. Most sector funds have a minimum of 25% of their assets invested in its specialty. These funds offer high appreciation potential, but may also pose higher risks to the investor. Examples include gold funds (gold mining stock), technology funds, and utility funds.

=== Income fund ===
An equity income fund stresses current income over growth. The fund's objective may be accomplished by investing in the stocks of companies with long histories of dividend payments, such as utility stocks, blue-chip stocks, and preferred stocks.

Option income funds invest in securities on which options may be written and earn premium income from writing options. They may also earn capital gains from trading options at a profit. These funds seek to increase total return by adding income generated by the options to appreciation on the securities held in the portfolio.

=== Balanced fund ===
Balanced Funds invest in stocks for appreciation and bonds for income. The goal is to provide a regular income payment to the fund holder, while increasing its principal.

=== Asset allocation fund ===
A fund that owns stocks and a substantial amount of assets other than stocks is considered an asset allocation fund. These funds split investments between growth stocks, income stocks/bonds, and money market instruments or cash for stability. A fund that switches between asset classes based on predictions of future returns is called a tactical allocation fund. Other funds may maintain a more or less constant proportion of assets, due to the belief that such prediction is not reliable.

=== Fund of funds ===
"Fund of funds" implies that the assets of a fund are other funds. They may be stock funds, in which case the original fund can be called "fund of stock funds". See fund of funds.

=== Hedge funds ===
"Hedge fund" is a legal structure. Hedge funds often trade stocks but may trade or invest in anything else depending on the fund. This is done to reduce the risk of investments in stocks.

== See also ==
- Bond fund
- Money fund
- Income fund
- Target date fund
- Collective investment scheme
- Investment management
- Venture capital
