= Leonard E. Baum =

American mathematician (1931–2017)

Leonard Esau Baum (August 23, 1931 – August 14, 2017) was an American mathematician, known for the Baum–Welch algorithm and Baum–Sweet sequence. He graduated Phi Beta Kappa from Harvard University in 1953, and earned a Ph.D. in mathematics from Harvard in 1958, with a dissertation titled Derivations in Commutative Semi-Simple Banach Algebras.

He developed the Baum–Welch Algorithm with Lloyd Welch while working for the Communications Research Division of IDA. It enabled the development of speech recognition and had applications in cryptanalysis and genetics. He coined the motto of the Communications Research Division: "Bad ideas is good, good ideas is terrific, no ideas is terrible."

Later, in the late 1970s and early 1980s, Baum used mathematical models for currency trading, working with Monemetrics, a predecessor of hedge fund management company Renaissance Technologies. He left the firm in 1984 amid steep losses. In his later years, he would participate in Go tournaments and work on mathematical problems relating to prime numbers and the Riemann hypothesis. He died at his home in Princeton, New Jersey, on August 14, 2017, at the age of 86.
