= Income drawdown =

Income drawdown is a method withdrawing benefits from a UK Registered Pension Scheme. In theory, it is available under any money purchase pension scheme. However, it is, in practice, rarely offered by occupational pensions and is therefore generally only available to those who own, or transfer to, a personal pension.

There are a number of different types of draw-down structures:

- Capped income drawdown - these permit the policy holder to withdraw an annual income between nothing and a maximum based on the initial fund value, their age at the time, and the current rates set by the UK Government Actuary's Department. The maximum is revised every three years until the 75th birthday and thereafter at annual intervals. The individual can choose to buy an annuity at any time.
- Flexible income drawdown - these allowed anyone who could prove they had enough qualifying secure pension earnings, to have unlimited access to their other pension fund. For flexible drawdown declarations made between 6 April 2011 and 26 March 2014, this amount was £20,000. For flexible drawdown declarations made on or after 27 March 2014, the amount is £12,000.
- Flexi-access drawdown - is a form of income drawdown introduced in 2015, which removing a number of the restrictions for those wishing to access their pensions. The flexi-access drawdown permits unlimited withdrawals from the pension fund from the age of 55. All withdrawals are treated as taxable UK income.

Income drawdown commences when the individual designates funds for it. At that time, they are permitted to take a Pension Commencement Lump Sum (a tax free lump sum of up to one third of the amount designated for income, i.e., 25% of the total taken at that time) and a life annuity is not purchased with the remainder. The income drawdown fund is also known as a crystallised pension fund. It is possible to crystallise a pension in stages. Uncrystalised Funds Pension Lump Sums or UFPLS, is an additional flexible way to take pension benefits. Rather than move the whole fund into a drawdown arrangement, ad-hoc lump sums can be taken from the pension. Any withdrawals will allow 25% to be taken tax free with the remaining 75% of the fund treated as taxable income.

== History ==
=== Introduction in 1921 and early development ===
The "mandatory annuitisation of pension funds" dates back to the Finance Act 1921. A requirement to annuitise between the ages of 60 and 70 was introduced by the Finance Act 1956. The upper age limit was increased to 75 by the Finance Act 1976.

From 1995, in response to falling annuity rates, income drawdown was introduced as an alternative way of drawing an income and, under the original rules, purchasing an annuity no later than the 75th birthday.

The limits for withdrawal, set by the Inland Revenue, using annuity rates calculated by the Government Actuary's Department (GAD), set limits to the withdrawals based on the age of the individual and the existing gilt yield. Originally the minimum and maximum withdrawal rate was set at 35% and 100% of an amount that broadly reflected the annuity that could have been bought based on a single life basis with no annual increases.

To prevent the erosion of capital a review was conducted every third anniversary, with new limits being set based on the individual's age, the Gilt rate and fund size at the time. The requirement for a minimum income withdrawal was later removed.

=== 2006 and 2011 pension reforms ===
Pension reforms in 2006 extended the option for drawdown beyond age 75, but with greater restrictions. At that time income drawdown was given the alternative name of an unsecured pension (USP) prior to age 75 and an alternatively secured pension (ASP) after age 75. Neither provided a secured status. Income limits were capped at 100% of the relevant GAD rate for USPs and 70% in respect of ASPs. For ASPs the limits of 55% to 90% applied. These reforms also redefined the review period as every five years for USPs and annually for ASPs.

After April 2011, drawdown has been reintroduced as the common term and those under 75 can withdraw up to 150% (120% prior to March 2014) of the GAD rate. Once again review dates occur every three years for those under 75 and annually thereafter. The requirement to buy an annuity at 75 was removed.

An income drawdown started before 6 April 2011 had to be converted to the new rules, or the pensioner had to purchase an annuity. There were transitional rules in place, giving a deadline to do this.

As saving for a pension in the UK is subsidised by tax relief on contributions into an approved scheme, the government therefore imposes regulations on registered schemes (largely enforced by HMRC); and pension providers and independent financial advisers advising on pension planning are regulated by the UK Financial Conduct Authority. The effect of the regulations is that income withdrawal comes in two forms - capped drawdown and flexible drawdown. So in practical terms drawdown pension can be paid one or more of three ways:

1. capped drawdown
2. Uncrystalised Funds Pension Lump Sums (UFPLS)
3. flex-access drawdown, or
4. through a short-term annuity

=== 2015 reducing restrictions ===
In the March 2014 Budget, George Osborne announced that from 6 April 2015, there would no longer be any restrictions for those wishing to access their pensions. This permits unlimited withdrawals from the pension fund from the age of 55. All withdrawals are treated as taxable UK income. From 6 April 2015, a capped drawdown scheme can be converted to flexi-access drawdown.

== Types of income drawdown ==
Unless a short term annuity is purchased, an Income drawdown purchased after 6 April 2015 will be a flexi-access drawdown.

=== Flexi-access drawdown ===
Flexi-access drawdown is available to all pensioners. Anyone with flexi-access drawdown can withdraw as little or as much income from their pension fund, as they choose, as and when they need it. It will be subject to income tax based on how much is withdrawn in each tax year, subject to the usual tax free allowances.

=== Capped drawdown ===
Some old income drawdown schemes were capped drawdown. While there is no government imposed minimum income to be taken, the maximum that can be taken is prescribed or "capped". The limit applies to the total of payments taken as income withdrawal and short-term annuities The new maximum amount of income that may be drawn is 150% (previously 120% pre 27/03/2014) of the single life annuity that a person of the same gender and age could purchase based on Government Actuary's Department rates. In other words, one's pension provider calculates the maximum income the saver can receive, using standard tables prepared by the Government Actuary's Department. This can mean that, if a person is in poor health, he or she should take specific advice from an Independent Financial Adviser on his/her personal position, as the pensioner may be better off with an impaired life annuity with guaranteed options. The maximum limit is reviewed every 3 years until age 75 and yearly thereafter. Exceeding the limit will be classed as "an unauthorised payment". The pensioner will be liable to tax currently between 40% & 55% on the unauthorised payment. In addition to the tax charge imposed on the pensioner, the scheme administrator will have to pay a scheme sanction tax charge of at least 15 per cent of the unauthorised payment.

== Commencement ==
Income drawdown can be started at the same time as a saver can start to get any authorised pension from a registered pension scheme. Normally this starts at age 55. A person can start drawing a pension earlier if:

- he or she is retiring due to ill-health, or
- he or she has a protected pension age which allows him or her to retire earlier than 55.

There is no upper limit for commencement. (Most forms of pension have to be taken before age 75.) Opting for Income drawdown therefore has the advantage of enabling savers to put off drawing any income from their pension savings for as long as it suits them.

=== Commutation ===
When a saver starts income drawdown, as with other options for taking a pension, he or she has a one-off chance to take a tax free lump sum of up to 25%. This type of lump sum is now called a pension commencement lump sum. Anyone wanting to put off taking a pension commencement lump sum until after age 75, should take independent expert advice from an Independent Financial Adviser about "designation" well before his/her 75th Birthday. Since not all pension providers permit postponement after 75, it may be necessary before the pensioner attains 75 for his/her Independent Financial Adviser to transfer the pension savings to another provider whose internal rules permit this. Whilst the rules permit transfer, it can be quite a lengthy process in practice and involve investment timing issues (some Providers turn all the pot into cash and transfer a monetary sum to the new provider).

=== Flexible planning ===
Not all a person's pension savings have to go into a single income drawdown. There are many permutations, but they are beyond the scope of this article: for example part of a saver's pension savings can be used to buy an annuity Annuity (European financial arrangements) and part put into income drawdown; some or all of a saver's pension savings can be split, so creating separate sub-funds, which can then put into payment "crystallised" at different times. Some additions can be made to a pension drawdown fund, as well as further contributions into the scheme providing the drawdown pension, or into another pension scheme. But if a person is considering taking a drawdown pension as flexible drawdown, it is necessary first to consider the tax consequences if s/he wishes to continue making contributions. Even income drawdown in payment can be transferred to another pension scheme, subject to observing some conditions.

== Taxes ==
Income paid under income drawdown, like any form of pension in payment, will be taxed as part of the pensioner's income for Income Tax. In fact, the scheme administrator should deduct Income Tax under PAYE (so the pensioner will only receive the net amount). [Unlike the case where a drawdown pension is being paid using a short-term annuity, where there is a possible tax trap. The taxable amount is the amount due to be paid in the tax year under the terms of the contract: so the pensioner may have to pay income tax in a particular tax year even though he/she did not actually get the payment in that tax year.] The 25% tax free lump sum for pensions can be spread across multiple years, so for example, each year 25% of the amount crystallised into drawdown can be taken without liability to income tax.

== Differences between income draw-down and annuities ==
A key object of income draw-down is to structure the fund to allow the pensioner to benefit from future investment performance. Part of the fund can be invested with the aim of matching or beating inflation, to inflation-proof the fund. The excess return, which cannot be paid because of the operation of the cap, can be rolled up within the attractive pension tax wrapper.

A pensioner who buys an annuity hands over a capital sum and, in return, the insurance company pays the pensioner an amount stipulated under the annuity contract based on their life expectancy and the assumed returns on an underlying investment. The contract is guaranteed by the insurer for life on the assumption that those living longest will receive the cross-subsidy of those who die earlier. The income may be guaranteed or based on investments that may affect the future level of income. Guaranteed contracts are loosely based on the current fifteen year gilt rate (gilts being the bonds issued by the UK government. A prospective pensioner in ill-health may be able to buy an impaired life annuity that assumes a shorter life expectancy and would provide a greater level of payment than a standard annuity.

Once a pensioner buys an annuity, no further changes can be made. With income drawdown, a pensioner can stop, start and change income levels at any time, subject to available funds and HMRC limits or they may purchase an annuity at a later date.

Income drawdown carries the risks of investment values going down (and for capped drawdown GAD rates reducing through changes in life expectancy or interest rates). In addition to this the value of cross-subsidy increases exponentially with age. Within a cohort of individuals starting their annuity at the same age, those living longer than the expected average stand to gain more the greater that age is. Conversely, each of these annuitants is statistically also more likely to provide the cross subsidy to others on early death. The measure of monetary benefit or loss provided by cross-subsidy can therefore only be measured in certain terms with hindsight.

There is a risk that if too much is taken from drawdown that the funds will be depleted. This can happen because the pensioner lives significantly longer than expected. In contrast the annuity is guaranteed to be paid for life. However, if an annuity is not index linked then inflation can eat away at the spending power most significantly at those later years. The other way that the pot can be depleted is if investment performance is poor, for example if stock markets go down significantly and withdrawals are not adjusted to take this into account.

== Benefits on death ==
An annuity is a contract that, in return for a capital payment, pays the annuitant an income until death. At the moment the annuitant dies, the annuity becomes valueless as it will not pay anything more, unless the annuitant bought additional benefits when purchasing the annuity. Nowadays annuity providers do provide a number of different add-ons, but each comes with a cost.

In contrast, individuals with a drawdown arrangement or with uncrystallised pension funds will be able to nominate a beneficiary to pass their pension to if they die. If the individual dies before they reach the age of 75, they will be able to give their remaining defined contribution pension to anyone as a lump sum completely tax free, if it is in a drawdown account or uncrystallised.

The person receiving the pension will pay no tax on the money they withdraw from that pension, whether it is taken as a single lump sum, or accessed through drawdown.

Anyone who dies with a drawdown arrangement or with uncrystallised pension funds at or over the age of 75 will also be able to nominate a beneficiary to pass their pension to.

The nominated beneficiary will be able to access the pension funds flexibly, at any age, and pay tax at their marginal rate of income tax.

There are no restrictions on how much of the pension fund the beneficiary can withdraw at any one time. There will also be an option to receive the pension as a lump sum payment, subject to a tax charge of 45%.

== Safe withdrawal rates ==
Academic research has been published discussing what percentage of a portfolio in drawdown which may be spent each year without risking depletion of the portfolio during retirement. It was previously considered that 4% was a safe withdrawal rate (if the amount withdrawn was fixed at 4% of the portfolio value at retirement date and increased each year in line with inflation), but while that works across known history, it may no longer be true for today's extreme financial valuations.

== See also ==
- Pensions in the United Kingdom
- Personal pension scheme
