= Asset-backed commercial paper program =

An asset-backed commercial paper program (ABCP program, ABCP conduit, or simply conduit) is a type of non-bank financial entity that issues short-term debt, known as asset-backed commercial paper (ABCP), to fund medium- to long-term assets. These programs act like banks by providing liquidity and transforming maturities—borrowing short-term to finance longer-term investments—but operate outside traditional banking regulation. This structure makes them part of the shadow banking system, which involves financial activities beyond the oversight of standard banking rules.

Often set up by banks, ABCP programs typically manage bank assets off-balance-sheet, possibly to bypass regulatory capital requirements, a practice that tied them to the 2008 financial crisis.

In terminology, "ABCP" refers to the commercial paper itself, with maturities ranging up to 270 days and averaging around 30 days, while "conduit" means the issuing program.

== History ==
ABCP programs first appeared in the mid-1980s. Initially, ABCP conduits were primarily sponsored by major commercial banks as a means of providing trade receivable financing to their corporate customers. Over the past decade, ABCP programs have grown to serve a wide variety of needs such as: asset-based financing for companies that cannot access the commercial paper market, warehousing assets prior to security issuance, investing in rated securities for arbitrage profit, providing leverage to mutual funds, and off-balance sheet funding of bank assets.

Above all these service types, ABCP programs are commonly used by banks to free up their regulatory capitals by moving the seemingly safe assets off their balance sheet. Traditionally, banks keep everything on their balance sheet and owners of the bank have to hold a certain amount of equity to meet the capital requirement. This means if a bank wants to invest in a large new project, i.e. increase its asset largely, it has to increase owners' equity proportionality. Moving such project off bank's balance sheet eliminates the need of increasing equity. Through setting up ABCP conduits, banks can fund assets all by short-term liabilities.

In general, any asset class that has been funded in the term market has been funded in a conduit, and there are a wide variety of assets that are unique to the conduit market, however, at the time of 2007, the major asset of most ABCP programs is asset-backed security backed by residential mortgages.

As of September 2001, there were approximately 280 active ABCP programs, with more than $650 billion in outstanding. During the mid-2000s, ABCP saw a steady rise in popularity because of their high ratings from the perspective of investors and the low borrowing rates from companies who need money. Gradually, even more conservative investors, such as money market mutual funds and retirement funds began purchasing ABCP. This optimism pushed the outstanding of ABCP to $1.3 trillion by the time of July 2007. At that time, ABCP was the largest money market instrument in the United States, following by Treasury Bills with about $940 billion outstanding. However, this trend came to an abrupt end in August 2007.

=== Subprime mortgage crisis ===
In 2007, as negative information about U.S. residential mortgages spreads out, securities backed with mortgages, including sub-prime mortgages, widely held by ABCP programs of financial firms globally, started to lose their value. ABCP investors started to worry about the value of the asset backing their ABCP and stopped rolling over their position. At the beginning, sponsor banks have enough liquid to pay off these liabilities, but lack of market confidence can create a subprime mortgage crisis.

In August 2007, the French bank BNP Paribas halted withdrawals from three funds invested in ABCP and suspended calculation of net asset values. Even though defaults on mortgages had been rising throughout 2007, the suspension of withdrawals by BNP Paribas has a profound effect on ABCP market. The interest rate spread of over-night ABCP and Federal funds rate increased from 10 basis points to 150 basis points within one day of announcement.

Subsequently, the ABCP market experienced a modern-day bank run. Several ABCP conduits fell victim to the liquidity crisis. Since the sponsors financial institutions. such as banks only need to keep regulatory capital for on-balance sheet assets, and none for the assets funded by ABCP conduits, they got into huge trouble paying back investors who refused to roll over their ABCP. Several major financial institutions collapsed in the following year because of these solvency issues and had to be bailed out by government.

In December 2007, ABCP outstanding dropped from $1.3 trillion to $833 billion. By the end of 2008, there was no SIVs left. As of March 2013, the outstandings of ABCP were about $300 billion.

== Structure ==
An ABCP conduit is set up by a sponsoring financial institution (henceforth, sponsor). The sole purpose of a conduit is to purchase and hold financial assets from a variety of asset sellers. The conduit finances the assets by selling asset-backed commercial paper to outside investors such as money market funds or other "safe asset" investors like retirement funds.

Take the conduit Grampian as an example. Grampian is a conduit set up and managed by HBOS. HBOS's management responsibilities consist of selecting the assets (Airbus, mortgages, etc.) to be purchased by Grampian and issuing short-term ABCP in order to finance the assets. HBOS sells the ABCP to outside investors such as Fidelity and rolls over the ABCP at regular intervals.

Structure of an ABCP conduit

As in banks, the maturity of assets in ABCP conduits generally is longer than the maturity of the liabilities. More than half of ABCP daily issuance has maturities of 1 to 4 days, referred to as "overnight", and the average maturity of outstanding paper is about 30 days. ABCP programs regularly roll over their liabilities and use proceeds from new issuances to pay off maturing commercial paper. Loan and lease receivables, which are assets commonly purchased by ABCP conduits, likely have terms of 30 days or more, and while relatively short, are still longer than most ABCP. Most of the conduit assets are medium- to long-term assets with maturities of three to five years.

=== Financial institution (sponsor) ===
The sponsors of the conduit play two roles: manage assets and provide liquidity. Sponsor types range from large U.S. commercial banks to non-bank institutions, like mortgage lenders and asset managers. Large U.S. banks have long sponsored ABCP programs, some smaller U.S. banks sponsor a very modest share. Foreign banks sponsor a substantial share of ABCP, about 40 percent in 2007. Non-bank institutions, such as mortgage lenders, finance companies, or asset managers, also sponsor a considerable share of the market. Programs sponsored by non-bank institutions grew more dramatically than other programs from 2004 to 2007, more than doubling in assets to $400 billion. The ten largest sponsors as of January 2007 are:

1. Citigroup (U.S.)
2. ABN AMRO (Netherlands)
3. Bank of America (U.S.)
4. HBOS Pls (U.K.)
5. JP Morgan (U.S.)
6. HSBC (U.K.)
7. Deutsche Bank AG (Germany)
8. Société Générale (France)
9. Barclays Plc (U.K.)
10. Rabobank (Netherlands)

Conduits can generate significant risks for the sponsor. The sponsor's guarantee typically covers the conduit's roll-over risk, which is the risk that a conduit cannot refinance maturing commercial paper, possibly because of a deterioration of conduit asset values. In that case, the sponsor has to assume the losses from lower asset values, because under the guarantee sponsors are required to repurchase assets at par. In exchange for assuming this risk, the sponsor receives the conduit profits.

==== Types of guarantees ====
Conduit sponsors use four different types of guarantees which provide different levels of insurance to outside investors. The four types of guarantees, ranked from strongest to weakest, are full credit guarantees ("full credit"), full liquidity guarantees ("full liquidity"), extendible notes guarantees ("extendible notes"), and guarantees arranged via structured investment vehicles (SIV).

Full credit

Full credit guarantees are guarantees that require the sponsor to pay off maturing asset-backed commercial paper independent of the conduit's asset values. From a regulatory perspective, full credit guarantees are considered equivalent to on-balance sheet financing, because they expose banks to the same risks as assets on the balance sheet. Therefore, if the bank offer full credit guarantee, the backing assets will be on the balance sheet, thus are included in the calculation of capital needed to meet capital requirement. In practice, these guarantees are infrequently used by financial institutions that have to satisfy bank capital requirements.

Full liquidity

Full liquidity guarantees are similar to full credit guarantees with the main difference being that the sponsor only needs to pay off maturing asset-backed commercial paper if the conduit assets are not in default. Hence, there is a possibility that full liquidity guarantees expire before the asset-backed commercial paper matures. This form of guarantees is weaker than full credit, but from the bank's side, they can move these assets off the balance sheet.

Extendible notes

Extendible notes guarantees are similar to full liquidity guarantees with the main difference being that the conduit issuer has the discretion to extend maturing commercial paper for a limited period of time (usually 60 days or less). By extending the maturity of the commercial paper, it is more likely that the conduit's assets are in default before the commercial paper matures. From the viewpoint of an outside investor, extendible notes guarantees are therefore riskier than full liquidity guarantees. This guarantee was used by weaker financial institutions and by conduits with higher quality assets.

SIV

SIV guarantees are also similar to full liquidity guarantees with the main difference being that SIV guarantees only cover a share of the conduit liabilities (usually around 25%). Since SIV guarantees do not cover all conduit liabilities, they are considered partial insurance to outside investors. SIV guarantees were primarily used by commercial banks and other financial institutions to cover high quality assets.

=== Asset types ===
The asset types that conduits invested in are mostly asset-backed securities (ABS), residential mortgages, commercial loans and CDOs. Most of the assets are AAA-rated, some holds un-rated assets generated by the sponsor financial institution. The asset origins are mostly United States (68%), Germany (15%) and United Kingdom (10%).

=== Outside investors ===
The outside investors are mostly risk sensitive investors like money market fund and retirement funds.

== Benefits ==
Originally, banks set up ABCP conduits to finance only safe assets off-balance sheet. Since these assets are considered safe, it is socially optimal for banks to invest more at a lower cost. ABCP conduit provides a way to free up regulatory capital, and thus achieve higher efficiency. At the same time, since safe assets are moved out of balance sheet, policy makers can target regulatory capital requirements only on the risky assets, which is what remains on the balance sheet.

== Costs ==
However, due to no capital requirement for off-balance sheet assets, ABCP conduits also induce excessive risk taking. For example, banks may spread their capital very thin, and invest in highly risky projects that they would not have invested absent the mitigating effects of ABCP conduit on regulatory capital requirements. Especially when the sponsor bank is big, ABCP induces high moral hazard. When good state realized, the risky project will yield very high returns, but when bad state realized, the big bank expect government to bail it out. Therefore, banks optimally take on more risk because it does not care about the losses that occur in those states of nature when it goes bankrupt. Creditors will be bailed out and the interest rate at which the bank can borrow is therefore insensitive to bankruptcy risk. This is called "risk shifting"—shifting the risk from banks to the public. Most likely, policy makers find it optimal to bail out the bank, but needless to say, it is socially very costly.

== Risks ==
Most conduits minimize their credit risk by holding a diversified portfolio of high quality assets. Typically, they are restricted to purchasing AAA-rated assets or unrated assets of similar quality. Some conduits exclusively purchase unrated assets originated by their sponsoring financial institutions. Other conduits mostly purchase securitized assets originated by other financial institutions. Many conduits combine the two strategies by purchasing both securitized and un-securitized assets from several financial institutions.

Outside investors consider asset-backed commercial paper a safe investment for three reasons. First, the pool of conduit assets is used as collateral to secure the asset-backed commercial paper. Second, the conduit's sponsor provides guarantees to the conduit, which ensures that the sponsor repays maturing ABCPs in case the conduit is unable to pay off the maturing paper itself. Third, ABCP is very short-term, so that investors can easily liquidate their investment by not rolling over maturing ABCPs.

However, asset holdings of ABCP conduits, like at banks, are not transparent. While the vast majority of ABCP programs have credit ratings from the major rating agencies, credit support mechanisms vary and the specific assets held in the programs are not widely known. For example, some ABCP programs viewed their holdings to be 'proprietary' investment strategies and deliberately did not disclose. Thus, random events or concerns about an economic downturn can create uncertainty about asset values. This uncertainty is greater when less information is available about the assets.

While ABCP programs are like banks, a key distinction, with important implications for financial stability, is that ABCP programs do not have explicit deposit insurance provided by the government. Most traditional ABCP programs are sponsored by commercial banks that provide explicit liquidity support.

ABCP conduit induces regulatory arbitrage and excessive risk taking. With so few skin in the game, banks will increase their investments, and especially investments in risky projects with negative expected returns. The resulting high leverage and high risk will increase systemic risk of the financial system, which further impose huge risk on the broader economy.

== Types ==
There are five principal types of ABCP program:

- General purpose multi-seller
- Credit arbitrage
- Structured investment vehicle (SIV)
- Single-seller
- Loan-backed

=== General purpose multi-seller ===
The most traditional ABCP program is a multi-seller program, in which a conduit purchases receivables and loans from multiple firms. The sponsor is typically a financial institution that provides the conduit with a committed liquidity line, administers its daily operations, and sometimes also provides the conduit with credit enhancement through a letter of credit that absorbs credit losses. At the end of July 2007, just before the widespread turmoil, there were 98 multi-seller programs in the U.S. ABCP market with outstanding of $525 billion, about 45 percent of total ABCP outstanding.

=== Credit arbitrage ===
These programs involve banks sponsoring conduits to finance long-term assets through a special purpose entity that has a lower regulatory capital charge than if the assets were held on balance sheet. The sponsor banks typically provide full liquidity support. By using off-balance sheet funding, commercial banks exploit regulatory capital arbitrage opportunities. In July 2007, there were 35 programs that accounted for about 13 percent of the U.S. ABCP market.

=== SIV ===
SIVs fund highly rated securities. But unlike the credit arbitrage programs, SIVs do not have explicit agreements with their sponsoring banks for committed back-stop liquidity lines covering all their short-term liabilities. Instead SIVs relied on dynamic liquidity management strategies, which involved liquidating assets to pay investors if needed. At their peak in July 2007, there were 35 SIVs that accounted for $84 billion of U.S. ABCP. Some ABCP is issued by collateralized debt obligations (CDOs), sometimes called SIV-lites. CDOs are similar to SIVs in structure, but are not actively managed and tend to rely on explicit but only partial liquidity support. There were 36 ABCP CDO programs in July 2007, with ABCP outstanding of $47 billion.

=== Single-seller ===
Single-seller programs involve a conduit that issues commercial paper backed by assets from only one originator, which frequently also sponsors the conduit. The majority of single-seller conduits mainly fund credit-card receivables, mortgages, mortgage-backed securities, or auto loans. Such programs tended not to have explicit liquidity support, but were thought to be implicitly supported by originators. In July 2007, there were 40 non-mortgage single-seller programs, about 11 percent of the U.S. ABCP market. There also were 11 mortgage single-seller programs that primarily warehoused mortgages prior to their securitization.

=== Loan-backed ===
Loan-backed programs are bank-sponsored programs and fund direct loans to the bank's corporate customers. These loans are generally closely managed by the bank, and have a variety of covenants designed to reduce credit risk.

== Relation to 2008 financial crisis ==
One feature of ABCP is that they provide the ability to fund bank assets that do not appear on bank balance sheets. One result of keeping these assets off-balance sheet is that they do not factor in for regulatory capital requirements. Thus the ABCP market may contribute to systemic risk.

Before the 2008 financial crisis, the global financial system "manufactured" risk-less assets, totaling over $1.2 trillion, by selling short-term ABCP to risk-averse investors, predominantly U.S. money market funds, and investing the proceeds primarily in long-term U.S. assets.

As negative information about U.S. assets came to light in August 2007, banks experienced difficulties in rolling over ABCP and as a result several banks were bailed out by the U.S. government. Reduced liquidity tightened credit, affecting production sectors. As a result, economic activity worldwide was slowed and international trade declined. Governments and central banks responded with unprecedented fiscal stimulus, monetary policy expansion and institutional bailouts.
