= Thomas Cullinan =

Thomas Cullinan may refer to:

- Thomas A. Cullinan (1838–1904), American law enforcement officer
- Thomas Cullinan (Australian cricketer) (died 1907), Australian cricketer
- Thomas Cullinan (South African cricketer) (1946–2010), South African cricketer
- Thomas Cullinan (diamond magnate) (1862–1936), South African diamond magnate
- Thomas P. Cullinan (1919–1995), American author

== See also ==
- Cullinan (disambiguation)
