= List of tallest buildings in Utrecht =

Skyline of Utrecht
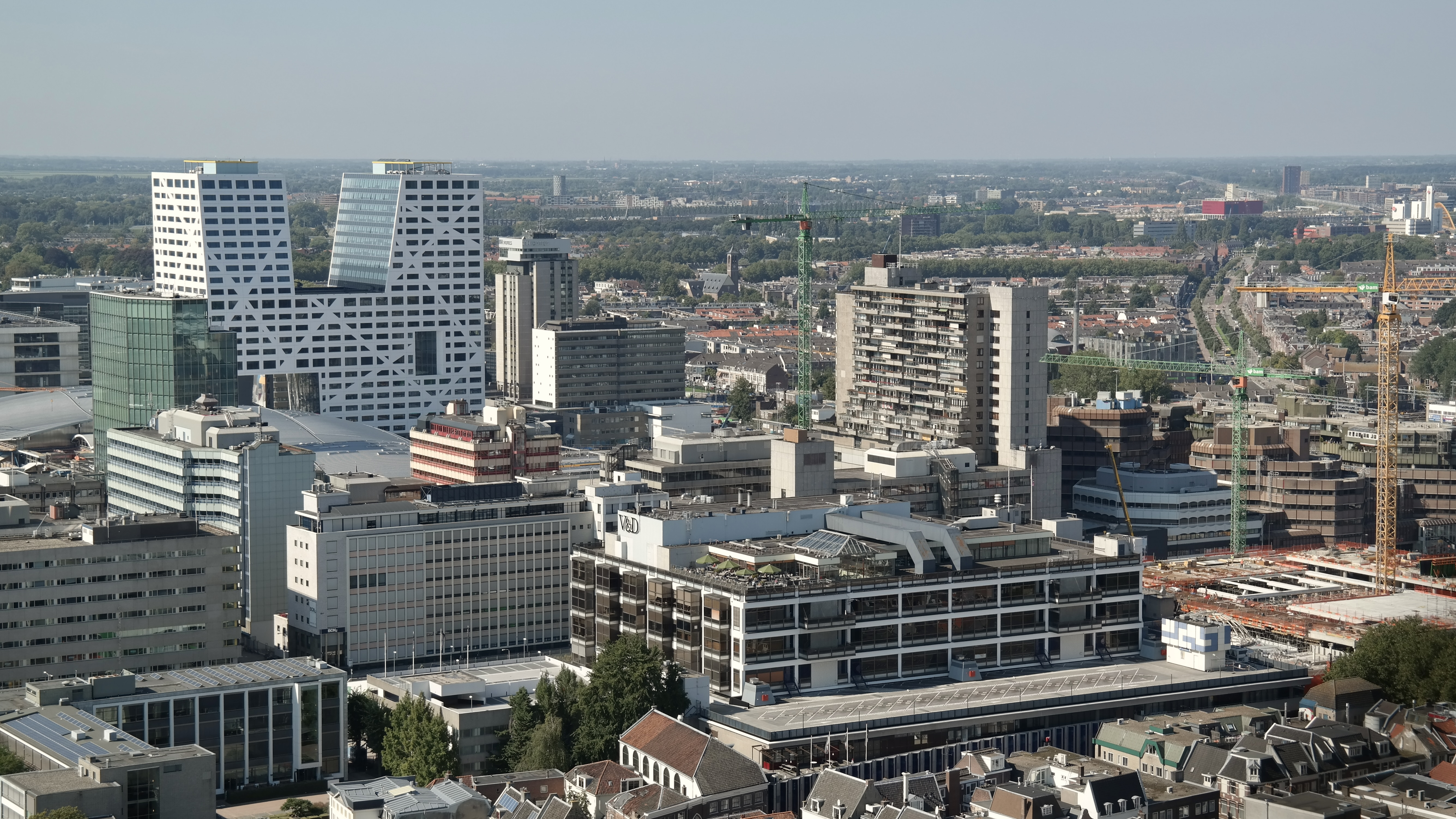
- Utrecht from the Dom Tower in 2015
- Tallest building: Rabobanktoren (2010); Wonderwoods (2019) (Note: Rabobanktoren and Wonderwoods are tied in height.)
- Tallest building height: 105 m (344 ft)
- Tallest structure: Dom Tower (1382)
- Tallest structure height: 112.3 m (368 ft)

Number of tall buildings (2026)
- Taller than 75 m (246 ft): 13
- Taller than 100 m (328 ft): 2

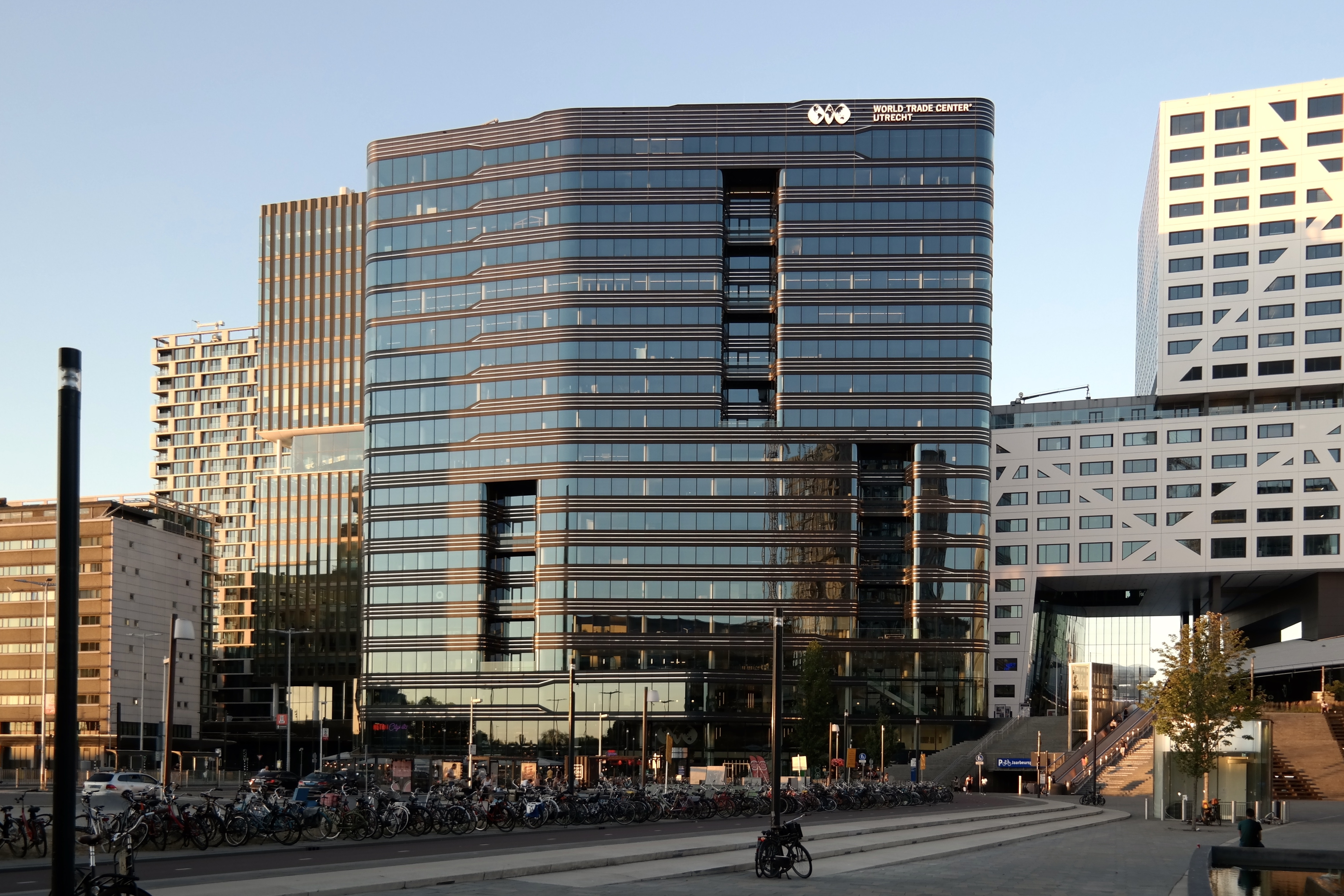
High-rises near Utrecht Centraal station

Utrecht is the fourth-largest city of the Netherlands and the capital of its eponymous province. The most prominent landmark on Utrecht's cityscape is the Dom Tower, the tallest belfry in the Netherlands at a height of 112 metres (388 ft), and part of the Cathedral of Saint Martin. Utrecht is also home to over a hundred high-rises, of which 13 stand taller than 75 m (246 ft). Due to the cultural importance of the Dom Tower, there has been an unwritten rule that no building could be built that exceeded it in height. The city's two tallest high-rise buildings, Rabobank Bestuurscentrum and Wonderwoods Vertical Forest, are the only two to surpass a height of 100 m (328 ft). Rabobanktoren and Wonderwoods Vertical Forest are tied in height, both being 105 m (344 ft) tall.

While high-rises have been built in the city since the 1960s, the early 21st century has seen an increase in the construction of tall buildings. Rabobank Bestuurscentrum, the current headquarters of Dutch bank Rabobank, was raised in 2010. Stadskantoor, housing the municipal government, was built in 2014 atop Utrecht Centraal station. The area around the station is home to some of Utrecht's tallest buildings, including the Wonderwoods development. Completed in 2024, the two towers of Wonderwoods features a "vertical forest" similar to that of Bosco Verticale in Milan, with balconies and facades planted with local tree species and shrubs.

In recent years, the restriction on the construction of buildings taller than the Dom Tower has been eased. Whether the restriction should remain has been a frequent topic of debate. A proposal for a 262 m (860 ft) tall skyscraper, the Belle van Zuylen tower was put forward in 2007, but was cancelled after the Great Recession. The MARK development, currently approved for construction, would include a 42-story high-rise reaching 135 metres (443 ft) in height.

== History ==
Number of buildings by height in Utrecht by the end of each year, based on the information in this article. Click on the legend to toggle a specific height on or off. View chart definition.

== Map of tallest buildings ==
This map displays the location of all buildings taller than 75 m (246 ft) in Utrecht. Each marker is numbered by the building's height rank, and coloured by the decade of its completion.

Buildings taller than 75 m (246 ft) in Utrecht
- 1960s
- 1970s
- 1980s
- 1990s
- 2000s
- 2010s
- 2020s
1 Rabobanktoren
2 Wonderwoods Vertical Forest
3 Stadskantoor
4 De Syp
5 Central Park
6 Kantoortoren Galghenwert
7 Le Mirage
8 Rijkswaterstaat Westraven
9 Provinciehuis
10 RIVM/CBG Building
11 NS-Groep NV
12 Willem C. van Unnikgebouw
13 WTC Utrecht

== Tallest buildings ==
This list ranks completed buildings in Utrecht that stand at least 75 m (246 ft) tall as of 2026, based on standard height measurement. This includes spires and architectural details but does not include antenna masts. The “Year” column indicates the year of completion. Buildings tied in height are sorted by year of completion with earlier buildings ranked first, and then alphabetically.

Was the tallest building in Utrecht upon completion

Rank	Name	Image	Location	Height m (ft)	Floors	Year	Purpose	Notes
N/A	Dom Tower		52°05′26″N 5°07′17″E	112.3 (368)	N/A	1382	Religious	Tallest church tower in the Netherlands. It is considered a symbol of Utrecht. The tower is part of St. Martin's Cathedral.
1	Rabobanktoren		52°05′09″N 5°06′33″E	105 (344)	27	2010	Office	Tallest building in Utrecht completed in the 2010s. Since 2024, tied with Wonderwoods Vertical Forst as the tallest building in Utrecht. Tallest office building in Utrecht.
2	Wonderwoods Vertical Forest		52°05′14″N 5°06′21″E	105 (344)	31	2024	Residential	Tallest building in Utrecht completed in the 2020s. Also known as Introvert and Hawthorne Tower. Tied with Rabobanktoren as the tallest building in Utrecht. Tallest residential building in Utrecht.
3	Stadskantoor		52°05′22″N 5°06′29″E	94.4 (310)	22	2014	Office	
4	De Syp		52°05′27″N 5°06′27″E	93.6 (307)	30	2019	Residential	
5	Central Park		52°05′25″N 5°06′27″E	90 (295)	23	2021	Office	
6	Kantoortoren Galghenwert		52°04′39″N 5°08′36″E	85.6 (281)	22	2007	Office	Tallest building in Utrecht from 2007 to 2010.
7	Le Mirage		52°03′56″N 5°06′31″E	85.5 (281)	23	2009	Office	
8	Rijkswaterstaat Westraven		52°03′30″N 5°06′06″E	85.1 (279)	23	1977	Office	Tallest building in Utrecht from 1977 to 2007. The building underwent a major renovation in 2007, including a new facade.
9	Provinciehuis		52°05′42″N 5°09′11″E	84.9 (279)	18	1995	Office	Also known as Fortis Bank, as it was the former headquarters of Fortis. Serves as the provincial house of the province of Utrecht.
10	RIVM/CBG Building		52°05′00″N 5°09′55″E	79.6 (261)	16	2026	Mixed-use	The new home for the National Institute for Public Health and the Environment (RIVM). Contains both office and laboratory space. While the building topped out in 2021, its opening was repeatedly delayed until 2026.
11	NS-Groep NV		52°05′17″N 5°06′45″E	76 (249)	18	1990	Office	
12	Willem C. van Unnikgebouw		52°05′07″N 5°10′20″E	75.7 (248)	22	1968	Education	Tallest building in Utrecht from 1968 to 1977. Part of Utrecht Science Park, a campus of Utrecht University.
13	WTC Utrecht		52°05′22″N 5°06′26″E	75.4 (247)	19	2018	Office	

== Tallest under construction or proposed ==
=== Under construction ===
The following table includes buildings under construction in Utrecht that are planned to be at least 75 m (246 ft) tall as of 2026, based on standard height measurement. The “Year” column indicates the expected year of completion. Buildings that are on hold are not included.

Name	Height m (ft)	Floors	Year	Purpose	Notes
Galaxy Tower	93.6 (307)	31	2026	Mixed-use	Mixed-use hotel and residential building.

=== Proposed ===
The following table includes approved and proposed buildings in Utrecht that are planned to be at least 75 m (246 ft) tall as of 2026, based on standard height measurement. The “Year” column indicates the expected year of completion. Buildings that are on hold are not included.

Name	Height m (ft)	Floors	Year	Purpose	Notes
MARK toren 1	135 (443)	42	2030	Residential	Would be Utrecht's tallest building and structure if completed.
Oopen	105 (344)	27	2028	Office	
MARK toren 2	90 (295)	29	2030	Residential	

== Timeline of tallest buildings ==
This lists buildings that once held the title of the tallest building in Utrecht. This excludes the Dom Tower. If counted, the Dom Tower has been the tallest building in Utrecht since 1382.

Name	Image	Years as tallest	Height m (ft)	Floors	References
De Hoogt		1967–1968	62.3 (204)	18	
Willem C. van Unnikgebouw		1968–1977	75.7 (248)	22	
Rijkswaterstaat Westraven		1977–2007	85.1 (279)	23	
Kantoortoren Galghenwert		2007–2010	85.6 (281)	22	
Rabobanktoren		2010–present	105 (344)	27	
Wonderwoods Vertical Forest		2024–present	105 (344)	31	

== See also ==
- List of tallest buildings in the Netherlands
- List of tallest buildings in Amsterdam
- List of tallest buildings in Eindhoven
- List of tallest buildings in Rotterdam
- List of tallest buildings in The Hague
