= Cullinan =

Cullinan may refer to:

- Cullinan (surname), a surname
- Cullinan, Gauteng, a small town in South Africa
- Cullinan Diamond, the largest rough gem-quality diamond ever found
- Cullinan Finance, an SIV (structured investment vehicle) run by HSBC
- Rolls-Royce Cullinan, an ultra-luxury SUV produced by Rolls-Royce Motor Cars
- The Cullinan, a luxury residential estate in Hong Kong
