= Asset-backed commercial paper =

Type of financial security

Asset-backed commercial paper (ABCP) is a form of commercial paper that is collateralized by other financial assets. Institutional investors usually purchase such instruments in order to diversify their assets and generate short-term gains.

== Structure ==
ABCP is typically a short-term instrument that matures between 1 and 270 days (average of 30 days) from issuance and is issued by an Asset-backed commercial paper program, such as a Conduit or Structured investment vehicle (SIV).

A conduit is set up by a sponsoring financial institution. The sole purpose of a conduit is to purchase and hold financial assets from a variety of asset sellers. The conduit finances the assets by selling asset-backed commercial paper to outside investors such as money market funds or other “safe asset” investors like retirement funds.

The financial assets that serve as collateral for ABCP are ordinarily a mix of many different assets, mostly asset-backed securities (ABS), residential mortgages (RMBS), commercial loans and CDOs. Most of the assets are AAA-rated, some are un-rated assets generated by the sponsor financial institution, the mixture are jointly judged to have a low risk of bankruptcy by a ratings agency. The asset origins are mostly United States (68%), Germany (15%) and United Kingdom (10%). Many large institutions heavily invested in these assets because ABCP represented a very attractive investment opportunity: prior to August 2007 this instrument had never encountered difficulties, it benefited from high ratings from agencies and, importantly, institutions had cash assets to invest following a profitable period. However, in 2007-2008 many of these assets performed poorer than expected, making buyers much less willing to purchase ABCP or rollover.

== 2008 financial crisis ==
As the mortgage situation in the United States became more serious, market participants became unwilling to purchase ABCP. This caused trouble for financial institutions that had relied on sales of ABCP to obtain funds for use in longer-term investments (see maturity mismatch). For example, as one form of the ABCP program, the structured investment vehicles (SIVs) set up by some commercial banks financed their longer-term, higher-yield investing through sales of ABCP. This had been very profitable when ABCP was considered safe (so that ABCP buyers accepted a low interest rate). When some asset prices dropped, investors were less willing to buy or rollover ABCP. This forced SIVs to quickly liquidate their longer-term investments at a substantial loss. The losses together with the panic in liquidity market formed a liquidity shock to the banking sector, which led to contagion which propagated the crisis.

In Canada, the financial sector reforms undertook in the years preceding the 2008 financial crisis helped strengthen the country's banking system. However, and with an estimated value of CAD 33 billion in ABCP, the consequences of the collapse of the ABCP market could have been very damaging if the Caisse de dépôt et placement du Québec (CDPQ) and the Bank of Canada had not stepped in. In the summer of 2007, Henri-Paul Rousseau, then President and CEO of CDPQ had envisioned and negotiated a unique Canadian solution that consisted in converting the ABCP into long-term bonds with the major players signing the Accord de Montréal. This agreement has prevented a forced liquidation, which would have resulted in losses of CAD $20 billion. In the fall of 2008, Mark Carney's negotiation skills ensured the completion of what would be considered the largest restructuring in Canadian history. In 2008, RBC Dexia positioned the Caisse in the first quartile for returns amongst the large pension funds. Recently, investors that had purchased ABCP could recuperate as much as 95 cents for every dollar initially invested. In the end, the impact was minimal for institutions such as la Caisse de dépôt who recorded a negative impact of 0.1% on the return of depositors.

== See also ==
- 2008 financial crisis
- Asset-backed commercial paper program
- Asset-backed security
- Structured investment vehicle
