= Cullinan (surname) =

Cullinan is a surname. Notable people with the surname include:

- Alphonsus Cullinan (born 1959), Irish bishop
- Cormac Cullinan (fl. 1990s-present), South African attorney and author
- Daryll Cullinan (born 1967), South African cricketer
- Edward Cullinan (1931–2019), British architect
- Joseph S. Cullinan (1860–1937), American oil industrialist
- Mark Cullinan (born 1957), South African cricketer
- Mary Cullinan (1950–2021), American university president
- Patrick Cullinan (1932–2011), South African writer
- Shane Cullinan (born 1975), British composer
- Thomas Cullinan (diamond magnate), (1862–1936), South African diamond magnate
- Thomas A. Cullinan (1838–1904), US law enforcement officer
