= Master Liquidity Enhancement Conduit =

2007 American financial plan announced by three major banks

The Master Liquidity Enhancement Conduit (MLEC), also known as the Super SIV (structured investment vehicle), was a plan announced by three major banks based in the United States on October 15, 2007, to help alleviate the subprime mortgage financial crisis. Citigroup, JPMorgan Chase, and Bank of America created the plan in an effort to stave off financial damage. On 21 December 2007, CNN.com reported that the Super SIV fund plan was being abandoned and that the banks had stated the plan was "not needed at this time".

== History ==
The Master Liquidity Enhancement Conduit (MLEC), also known as the Super SIV (structured investment vehicle), was a plan announced by three major banks based in the United States on October 15, 2007, to help alleviate the subprime mortgage financial crisis. Citigroup, JPMorgan Chase, and Bank of America created the plan in an effort to stave off financial damage.

Because of a tightening of the credit markets linked to the crisis, a number of structured investment vehicles (SIVs), backed by major banking institutions, found themselves less able to obtain short-term financing on the open market, which they needed to ensure their continued operations, due to investors' concerns about the SIVs' exposure to subprime mortgages. Complicating the problem was that some of the investment securities held by the SIVs were valued by a computer model developed by the securities traders and investment banks. The mark-to-model process was used by all financial institutions where a deep and liquid market did not exist. Many of the securities' valuations could be found in the companies' financial reports as illiquid and hard-to-value Level 3 assets.

The credit crunch, along with pricing difficulties resulting from the mark-to-model process, caused fears that the SIVs might be forced to sell off their assets at "fire sale" prices, far below their stated value. The resulting flood of bargain-priced asset-backed securities could havefurther destabilized the credit markets and perhaps forced the parent institutions to place the SIVs on their balance sheets, indirectly reducing the amount of money the banks could loan.

The Master Liquidity Enhancement Conduit was intended to facilitate the short-term refinancing that these SIVs required, thus avoiding the risk of a self-reinforcing downward spiral in the ABS markets.

Some considered the Conduit a privately funded way to bail out large financial institutions that had made bad bets in the housing market. Part of this criticism resulted from Citigroup's involvement, as Citi had the largest exposure in SIVs, and there was some concern that the scheme would only delay problems, not lead to solutions.

The U.S. Department of the Treasury played a significant role in the idea. Treasury Secretary Henry Paulson championed the idea, with Under-Secretary for Domestic Finance Robert K. Steel taking the initiative in bringing the banks together to consider it. Others questioned the legality of fund participants' ability to work in concert, supporting price discovery in certain illiquid positions held by the SIVs, in light of U.S. antitrust law.

On October 19, 2007, Wachovia and Fidelity joined in the creation of the Conduit.

On 21 December 2007, CNN.com reported that the Super SIV fund plan was being abandoned and that the banks had stated the plan was "not needed at this time".
