= Structured investment vehicle =

Non-bank financial institution

A structured investment vehicle (SIV) is a non-bank financial institution established to earn a credit spread between the longer-term assets held in its portfolio and the shorter-term liabilities it issues. They are simple credit spread lenders, frequently "lending" by investing in securitizations, but also by investing in corporate bonds and funding by issuing commercial paper and medium term notes, which were usually rated AAA until the 2008 financial crisis. They did not expose themselves to either interest rate or currency risk and typically held asset to maturity. SIVs differ from asset-backed securities and collateralized debt obligations in that they are permanently capitalized and have an active management team.

They are generally established as offshore companies and so avoid paying tax and escape the regulation that banks and finance companies are normally subject to. In addition, until changes in regulations around 2008, they could often be kept off the balance-sheet of the banks that set them up – like asset management activity – escaping even indirect restraints through regulation even though the sponsoring banks usually provided some level of guarantee to investors in the SIV. Due to their structure, the assets and liabilities of the SIV were more transparent than traditional banks for investors. SIVs were given the label by Standard & Poor's—Moody's called them "Limited Purpose Investment Companies" or "LiPICs". They are considered to be part of the non-bank financial system, which has two parts, the shadow banking system comprising the "bank sponsored" SIVs (which operated in the shadows of the bank sponsors' balance sheets) and the parallel banking system, made up from independent (i.e. non-bank-aligned) sponsors.

Invented by Citigroup in 1988, SIVs were large investors in securitization. Some SIVs had significant concentrations in US subprime mortgages, while other SIV had no exposure to these products that are so linked to the 2008 financial crisis. After a slow start (there were only seven SIVs before 2000) the SIV sector tripled in assets between 2004 and 2007, and at their peak in mid 2007, there were about 36 SIVs with assets under management in excess of $400 billion. By October 2008, no SIVs remained active.

The strategy of SIVs is the same as traditional credit spread banking. They raise capital and then lever that capital by issuing short-term securities, such as commercial paper and medium term notes and public bonds, at lower rates and then use that money to buy longer term securities at higher margins, earning the net credit spread for their investors. Long term assets could include, among other things, residential mortgage-backed security (RMBS), collateralized bond obligation, auto loans, student loans, credit cards securitizations, and bank and corporate bonds.

== History ==
In 1988 and 1989, two London bankers, Nicholas Sossidis and Stephen Partridge-Hicks launched the first two SIVs for Citigroup, called Alpha Finance Corp. and Beta Finance Corp. Alpha had a maximum leverage of 5 times its capital with each asset requiring 20% of capital irrespective of its credit quality. Beta had leverage of up to 10 times capital but leverage was based on risk weightings of the assets. In 1993, Sossidis and Partridge-Hicks left Citigroup to form their own management firm, Gordian Knot, located in London's Mayfair. "Alpha Finance was created in response to volatility in the capital markets at the time. Investors wanted a highly-rated vehicle that would yield more stable returns on their capital, said Henry Tabe, a managing director for Moody's Investors Service's London office." Henry Tabe provides further historical background in his book on how SIVs unravelled during the crisis and lessons that can be learned from the sector's extinction.

In 1999, Professor Frank Partnoy wrote, "certain types of so-called 'arbitrage vehicles' demonstrate that companies are purchasing credit ratings for something other than their informational value. One example is the credit arbitrage vehicle, also known as a Structured Investment Vehicle (SIV). A typical SIV is a company which seeks to 'arbitrage' credit by issuing debt or debt-like liabilities and purchasing debt or debt-like assets, and earning the credit spread differential between its assets and liabilities. Much of an SIV's portfolio may consist of asset-backed securities." However, Portnoy's quote is misleading, in reality there is no such "arbitrage", the SIV is acting like any old fashioned spread banker, seeking to earn a spread between its income on assets and cost of funds on liabilities. It earns this spread by accepting two types of risk: a credit transformation (lending to AA borrowers while issuing AAA liabilities) and a maturity transformation (borrowing short while lending long). The scale of both transformations were considerably less than traditional banks, and leverage was also typically half to a quarter of that used by banks, so the risks were less and the returns available were also much lower.

The introduction of Basel I regulations made holding bank capital and asset-backed securities (ABSs) expensive for a bank, depending on the ratings assigned by one of the Government sponsored ratings agencies. ABS's that were able to attain a rating of AA or AAA had capital requirements as low as 1.6% of the securities' size (8%x20%), allowing for higher leverage than would have been allowed otherwise. Bank capital securities, such as dated subordinated debt could be weighted as highly as to amount to a deduction from capital. That is to say all the investment would be funded from capital.

A 'loophole' in the Basel accords meant that banks could provide a liquidity facility to the SIV of up to 360 days without holding capital against it so long as it was undrawn. However these facilities typically represented only between 10% and 20% of the total balance sheet of the SIV.

Partnoy then questioned the economic theory of SIVs: "How is the SIV able to earn such an 'arbitrage' spread between its assets and liabilities? If the SIV is simply a vehicle for purchasing financial assets, it should not be able to fund purchases of those assets at a lower rate than the rate on those assets. If it could, market participants with low funding rates would simply purchase the financial assets directly, and capture the spread for themselves. Put more simply, if a vehicle purchases $100 million of asset-backed bonds, priced at par, with a coupon of seven percent, and it seeks to fund that purchase by borrowing $100 million, it should not be able to borrow at a rate lower than seven percent."

Portnoy's theory misses the simple fact that the SIVs raised capital from third party investors with which to enhance the liabilities so these were not simple pass-through structures. Those investors benefitted from the SIV raising funding on their behalf at lower rates than they could themselves due to the tight criteria required by the rating agencies.

Alpha's maximum leverage was five times. Beta's leverage was up to 10 times, depending upon the quality of its asset portfolio. Subsequent SIVs, such as Centauri and Dorada, raised the leverage to around 20 times. Typically banks are leveraged between 25 and 50 times, so most SIVs operated with leverage of approx half that of traditional banks. By 2004, Sedna was offering notes that were leveraged over 100 times that attempted to achieve a spread of 10% or more in the medium term.

At the end of 2004, there were 18 operational SIVs that managed assets then valued at a total of $147 billion. At the end of 2005, according to Standard & Poor's, SIVs represented more than $200 billion of assets under management.

As of September 2007, one paper reported: "All SIVs to date have been established in either the Cayman Islands or Jersey so as to benefit from certain zero-tax regimes available in those jurisdictions. As mentioned, the SIV will usually also establish a subsidiary in Delaware to facilitate the issuance of debt in the US domestic market. The debt issued in the US will either be guaranteed by the offshore parent, or co-issued by the SIV and the subsidiary."

== Overview ==
A SIV may be thought of as a very simple virtual non-bank financial institution (i.e. it does not accept deposits). Instead of gathering deposits from the public, it borrows cash from the money market by selling short maturity (often less than a year) instruments called commercial paper (CP), medium term notes (MTNs) and public bonds to professional investors. SIVs had the highest ratings of AAA/Aaa, as a result of their very high quality portfolio requirements, almost zero exposure to interest rate and FX risk and large capital base (compared to traditional banks). This enabled them to borrow at interest rates close to the LIBOR, the rate at which banks lend to each other. The gathered funds are then used to purchase long term (longer than a year) bonds with credit ratings of between AAA and BBB. These assets earned higher interest rates, typically 0.25% to 0.50% higher than the cost of funding. The difference in interest rates represents the profit that the SIV pays to the capital note holders part of which return is shared with the investment manager.

== Structure ==
The short-term securities that a SIV issues often contain two tiers of liabilities, junior and senior, with a leverage ratio ranging from 10 to 15 times. The senior debt is invariably rated AAA/Aaa/AAA and A-1+/P-1/F1 (usually by two rating agencies). The junior debt may or may not be rated, but when rated it is usually in the BBB area. There may be a mezzanine tranche rated A. The senior debt is a pari passu combination of medium-term notes (MTN) and commercial paper (CP). The junior debt traditionally comprises puttable, rolling 10-year bonds, but shorter maturities and bullet notes became more common.

In order to support their high senior ratings, SIVs were obliged to obtain significant capital and liquidity facilities (so-called back-stop facilities) from banks to cover some of the senior issuance. This helps to reduce investor exposure to market disruptions that might prevent the SIV from refinancing its CP debt. To the extent that the SIV invests in fixed rate assets, it hedges against interest-rate risk.

There are number of crucial difference between SIV and traditional banking. The type of financial service provided by traditional deposit banks is called intermediation, that is the banks become intermediate (middlemen) between primary lenders (depositor) and primary borrowers (individual, small to medium size business, mortgage holder, overdraft, credit card, etc.). SIVs do exactly the same, "in effect", providing funds for mortgage loans, credit cards, student loans through securitised bonds.

In more traditional deposit banking, bank deposits are often guaranteed by the government. Regulators assume that deposits are stable as a consequence.

On the other hand, the money market for CP is far more volatile. There are no government guarantees for these products in case of default, and both sellers and lenders have equal power at setting the rate. This explains why the borrowing side of SIV consists of fixed term (30 to 270 days) rather than on-demand (1 day) deposits; however, in extreme circumstances like the 2007-8 credit crunch, the worried usual buyers of CP, facing liquidity worries, might buy more secure bonds such as government bonds or simply put money in bank deposits instead and decline to buy CP. If this happens, facing maturity of short term CP which was sold previously, SIV might be forced to sell their assets to pay off the debts. If the price of asset in depressed market is not adequate to cover the debt, SIV will default.

On the lending side, traditional deposit banks directly deal with borrowers who seek business loans, mortgages, students loans, credit cards, overdrafts, etc. Each loan's credit risk are individually assessed and reviewed periodically. More crucially, the bank manager often maintains personal oversight over these borrowers. In contrast, SIV lending is conducted through the process known as securitization. Instead of assessing individual credit risk, loans (for example, mortgage or credit card) are bundled with thousands (or tens of thousands or more) of the same type of loans. According to the law of large numbers, bundling of loans creates statistical predictability. Credit agencies then allocate each bundle of loans into several risk categories and provide statistical risk assessment for each bundle in similar manner to how insurance companies assign risk. At this point, the bundle of small loans is transformed into a financial commodity and traded on the money market as if it were a share or bond. The bonds usually selected by a SIV are predominantly (70-80%) Aaa/AAA rated asset-backed securities (ABSs) and mortgage-backed securities (MBSs). However, credit losses among the SIVs were very low until the last SIV entrants into the market invested in US Sub-prime. Most SIVs experienced no credit losses.

== Problems ==
The risks that arise are the same that Banks have always faced: First, the solvency of the SIV may be at risk if the value of the long-term security that the SIV has bought falls below that of the short-term securities that the SIV has sold. Banks typically avoid this risk by not marking to market their loan portfolios. Second, there is a liquidity risk, as the SIV borrows short term and invests long term; i.e., outpayments become due before the inpayments are due. Unless the borrower can refinance short-term at favorable rates, he may be forced to sell the asset into a depressed market.

When a traditional deposit bank provide loans such as business lending, mortgage, overdraft or credit card, they are stuck with the borrowers for years or even decades. Therefore, they have incentive to assess the borrowers' credit risk and further monitor the borrowers finance through their branch managers. In securitised loan, those who originate the loan can immediately sell off the loan to SIVs and other institutional investors and these buyers of securitised loans are the ones who are stuck with credit risk. Therefore, in SIV intermediation, there is the same incentive to assess credit risk of borrowers, as they expect to hold the asset to maturity. However, the loan originators', typically a Bank's, reward is structured so that as more loans are made and sold wholesale, more commission will be earned. So there is little need for bank originators to monitor their borrowers' credit risk. The monitoring was the responsibility of the end investor in the securitised tranches and, theoretically, the rating agencies. While most SIVs were able to make good credit decisions for their portfolios and did not experience any credit losses from securitisations, some invested in Sub prime US RMBS.

Upon review, it is evident that the credit risk assessment conducted by these forms of lending was far more inadequate than with the traditional lending done by deposit banks (although many large traditional Banks turned out to be over-exposed to mortgage risk both via loans and through their investments in securitisations). Some mortgage loans even turned up to be liar's loans with some borrowers essentially being NINJA (No Income, No Job or Assets). In traditional banking, when a downturn occurred, branch managers could individually review clients' financial condition, separate good borrowers from bad ones and provide individually tailored adjustments. SIVs, on the other hand, are staffed by investment managers, who assess the content of pools of securitized loans, but not the individual loans. The banks were exposed to first loss risks while the SIVs were only exposed to last loss risk. The ratings on the most shaky types of sub prime securitisations were exposed when it turned out that complicated mathematical models, which is used to rate securitized loan, made fundamental assumptions that turned out to be wrong. The most significant among these assumptions were the trends in U.S. housing prices which declined far faster, deeper and broader than statistical model predicted.

These complex statistical analyses were supposed to function as a good substitute for risk monitoring provided by individual branch bank managers. Had the model been correct, these inadequately assessed loans would have been rated as high risk resulting in a lower price for the bond. However, when housing prices were constantly increasing, borrowers with inadequate income could cover mortgage repayments by borrowing further money against increased value of their house. This somewhat fictitious good payment record, which may be obvious if it was monitored by a bank manager, fed into the mathematical model of rating agencies whose weakness was exposed when the housing market start to tank. The credibility of credit assessment provided by rating agencies was further eroded when it was revealed that they took a cut in the sales of securitised bonds which they themselves rated. When the entire spectrum of bundled loans from sub prime to premium AAA start to under-perform against statistical expectations, the valuation of assets held by SIVs became suspect. SIVs suddenly found it difficult to sell commercial paper while their previously sold commercial paper neared maturity. Moreover, their supposedly prime rated assets could be sold only at a heavy discount. In effect, this preciptaed a run on the entire non-bank system and since the banks relied on the SIVs and other non-banks for funding this also created a huge pressure on the banking system.

Though the assumption of ever increasing housing prices was the fundamental problem, there were other mathematical / statistical problems too. This is particularly important to prevent such things from happening again. There was an error in estimating the aggregate probability of default from components as the interaction effects could not be estimated with similar accuracy as the independent effect. For example, if an SIV had mortgage as well as auto loans the probability of default in the mortgage part or auto part could be estimated more accurately with the law of large numbers and past data with few assumptions like "the future will be similar to past". But to estimate the likelihood of mortgage default triggering defaults in auto loans is extremely difficult as past data points will miss that largely. So even if we assume some interaction effect was taken into consideration while pricing the SIV, it was far from accurate even mathematically from the beginning.

== 2007 Subprime mortgage crisis ==
In 2007, the sub-prime crisis caused a widespread liquidity crunch in the CP market. Because SIVs rely on short-dated CP to fund longer-dated assets, they need to roll over their liabilities, just like Banks do. Unlike standard asset backed commercial paper conduits, SIVs do not have liquidity facilities that cover 100% of their outstanding CP. Instead, a SIV's safeguard against being unable to issue new CP to repay maturing paper is being able to sell their assets, which were until then both highly rated and liquid.

In August 2007, CP yield spreads widened to as much as 100bp (basis points), and by the start of September the market was almost completely illiquid. That showed how risk-averse CP investors had become even though SIVs contain minimal sub-prime exposure and as yet had suffered no losses through bad bonds. It's a matter of debate, however, whether this risk aversion was a matter of prudence or misunderstanding by the CP market or contamination by a few SIVs that had Sub Prime exposure of the many that had little or no Sub Prime risk.

Several SIVs—most notably Cheyne—have fallen victim to the liquidity crisis. Others are believed to be receiving support from their sponsoring banks. It is notable that even among "failed" SIVs there have still been no losses to CP investors.

In October 2007 the U.S. government announced that it would initiate (but not fund) a Super SIV bailout fund (see also Master Liquidity Enhancement Conduit). This plan was abandoned in December 2007 and served to contaminate the entire sector. Instead, banks such as Citibank announced they would rescue the SIVs they had sponsored and would consolidate them onto the banks' balance sheets. On 11 February 2008, Standard Chartered Bank reversed its pledge to support the Whistlejacket SIV. Deloitte & Touche announced that it had been appointed receiver for the failing fund. Orange County, California has $80 million invested in Whistlejacket.

== Developments in 2008 ==
On 14 January 2008, SIV Victoria Finance defaulted on its maturing CP. Standard & Poor's downrated debt to "D".

Bank of America's fourth-quarter 2007 earnings fell 95% due to SIV investments. SunTrust Banks' earnings fell 98% during the same quarter.

Northern Rock, which in August 2007 became the first UK bank to have substantial problems from being unable to issue mortgage securitisations to fund itself, was nationalized by the British government in February 2008. At the same time, U.S. banks began borrowing extensively from the Term auction facility (TAF), a special arrangement set up by the Federal Reserve Bank in December 2007 to help ease the credit crunch. It is reported that the banks have borrowed nearly $50 billion of one-month funds collateralized by "garbage collateral nobody else wants to take". The Fed continued to conduct the TAF twice a month to ensure market liquidity. In February 2008, the Fed made an additional $200 billion available.

In 2008, Cullinan Finance, a HSBC subsidiary which had been one of the six largest SIVs in 2007, went into liquidation.

Central banks failed to heed Bagehot's dictum "to lend to all, against good collateral but at a penal rate" and to provide funding to the SIV during the liquidity crisis. They mistakenly believed that the SIVs were funded by the banks, not that the SIVs were a core part of funding the banking system by investing in the senior tranches of securitization and bank capital securities. This exacerbated the liquidity crisis.

On 2 October 2008 the Financial Times reported that Sigma Finance, the last surviving and oldest of the SIVs has collapsed and entered liquidation. Note that Sigma Finance actually disclaimed the SIV label and referred to itself as a "Limited Purpose Finance Company".

The US Government's Commercial Paper Funding Facility (CPFF), created under the TARP legislation became available to CP borrowers on 27 October 2008. However, by this time there were no SIVs left to rescue.

== List of Structured Investments Vehicles (SIVs) ==
Sponsor name	SIV conduit
(Netherlands) ABN AMRO	Amstel Funding
(United States) AIG	Nightingale Finance
(Spain) Axon Asset Management	Axon Financial Funding
(Canada) Bank of Montreal	Links Finance Parkland Finance
(United Kingdom) Barclays	Sheffield Receivables
(United States) Ceres Capital Partners	Victoria Finance
(United Kingdom) Cheyne Capital	Cheyne Finance
(United States) Citigroup	Beta Centauri Dorada Five Finance Sedna Finance Vetra Finance Zela Finance
(Germany) Dresdner Kleinwort (Commerzbank)	K2
(United Kingdom) Eaton Vance	Eaton Vance Variable Leveraged Fund
(United Kingdom) Eiger Capital Management	Orion Finance
(Belgium) Fortis (BNP Paribas)	Scaldis Capital
(United Kingdom) Gordian Knot	Sigma Finance Theta Finance
(United Kingdom) HBOS (Lloyds Banking Group)	Grampian Funding
(United Kingdom) HSBC	Asscher Finance Cullinan Finance Solitaire Funding
(Germany) HSH Nordbank	Carrera Capital Finance
(Austria) Hypo	Morrigan TRR
(Germany) IKB	Rhineland Funding
(Netherlands) ING	Mane Funding
(United Kingdom) Lloyds Banking Group	Cancara Asset
(United States) MBIA	Hudson-Thames Capital
(France) Natixis	Cortland Capital
(United States) NSM Capital Management	Abacas Investments
(Netherlands) Rabobank	Atlantis One Tango Finance
(France) Societe Generale	Premier Asset Collateralised Entity
(United Kingdom) Standard Chartered	Whistlejacket Capital White Pine
(Germany) WestLB	Harrier Finance Funding Kestrel Funding

== See also ==
- Collateralized debt obligation
- Shadow banking system
- Asset-backed commercial paper program
- Special-purpose entity
