= Rabo Mobiel =

Dutch mobile virtual network operator

- Type: Mobile virtual network operator
- Founded: November 2006
- Founder: Eric Huijgen, Teele Horstra, Eric Jan Pelt, Dan Armstrong
- Defunct: November 2014
- Headquarters: Utrecht, the Netherlands
- Area served: the Netherlands
- Products: postpaid and prepaid mobile telecommunication mobile banking services
- Parent: Rabobank
- Website: www.rabomobiel.nl

Rabo Mobiel was a Dutch mobile virtual network operator. It was launched on 15 November 2006 into a market where 50 virtual network operators were active at the time. Rabo Mobiel runs in cooperation with parent company Rabobank, offering on postpaid and prepaid mobile telecommunications services, and other mobile banking and payment services.

Originally launched to target the ca. 3 million Rabobank internet banking customers, Rabo Mobiel has grown to use web and retail channels, and target different segments, including youth, students and small businesses. At the end of 2007, Rabo Mobiel claimed to have 125.000 customers.

== Innovations ==
In addition to core telecommunications and mobile internet services, Rabo Mobiel focuses on promoting mobile banking and payments capabilities and applications. This includes products like SMS alerts, mobile banking via secure WAP, Java apps, smartphone Apps, SMS, mobile phone parking services, mobile banking via Samsung Jet, balance-checking apps, etc. From 2006-2009, Rabo Mobiel also worked extensively on NFC technologies, including trials at C1000 supermarkets (together with KPN, Logica and NXP Semiconductors, as well as Stichting RFID Nederland and Banksys), proof-of-concept programmes and trials with Coca-Cola, FEBO, Albert Heijn, Diergaarde Blijdorp, Achmea and Stichting Diabeter, MyOrder, Carian, and the American School of The Hague.

In July 2008, in conjunction with Rabobank Nederland, Rabo Mobiel launched Rabo SMS Betalen, a product for person-to-person and person-to-merchant payments using SMS and Java apps. The product was operator- and bank-independent, and therefore available to all customers, not only customers of Rabo Mobiel or the Rabobank. SMS Betalen was part of the same family of capabilities as later offered by NFC-based payments services Cashless Betalen, MyOrder and mijnID.
