= Rabobank =

Dutch banking and financial services company

Coöperatieve Rabobank U.A.

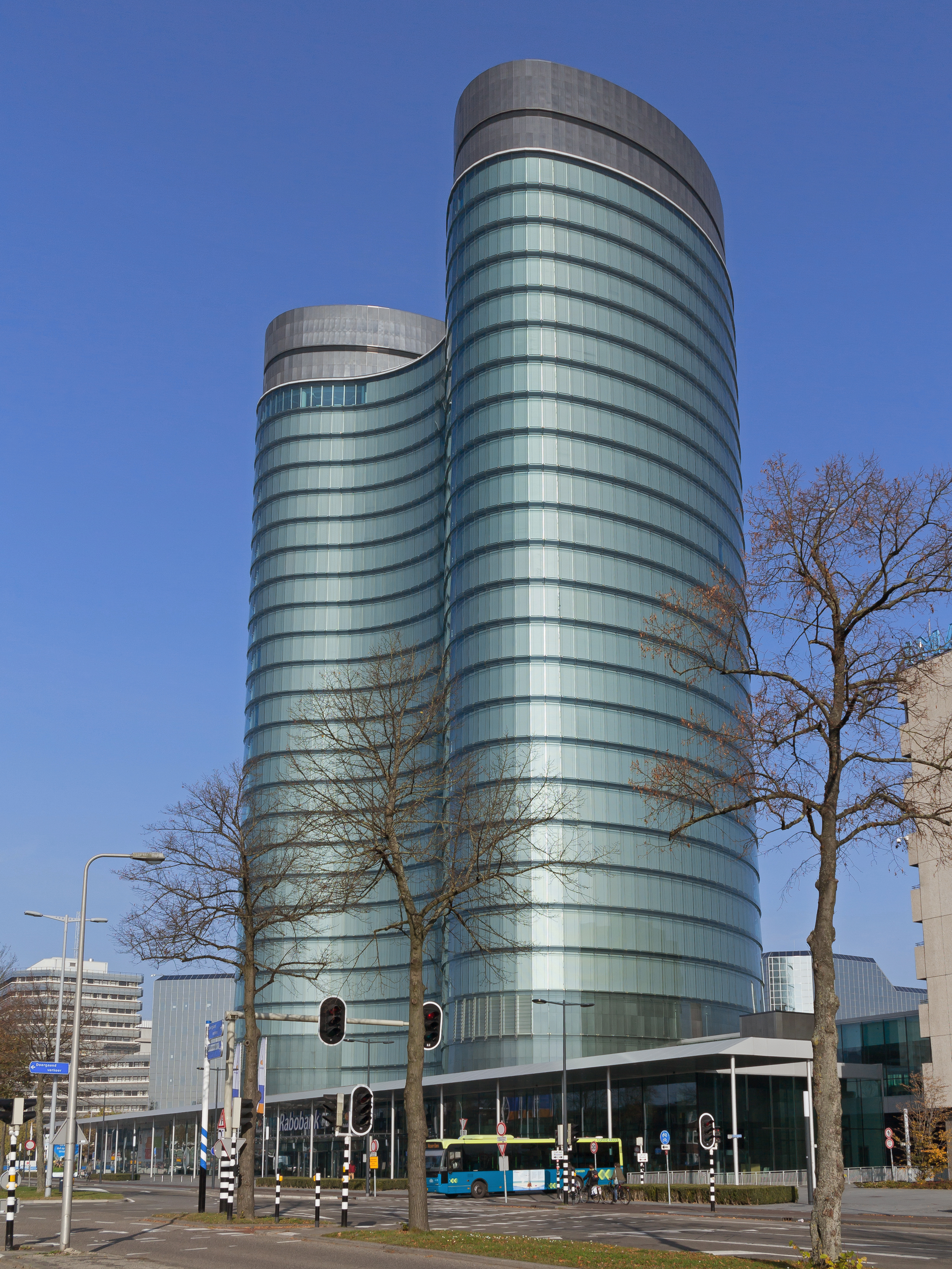
- Headquarters at Rabotoren
- Type: Uitgesloten aansprakelijkheid (excluded liability cooperative)
- Industry: Financial services
- Predecessors: Raiffeisen-Bank; Boerenleenbank
- Founded: 1895
- Headquarters: Rabotoren, Utrecht, Netherlands
- Number of locations: 144 (Netherlands) (2022)
- Area served: Worldwide
- Key people: Stefaan Decraene (Chairman); Bas Brouwers (CFO)
- Products: Banking; Insurance; Leasing; Real estate
- Revenue: ▼€12 billion (2022)
- Operating income: ▲€7 billion (2022)
- Net income: ▼€2.7 billion (2022)
- Total assets: ▲€635.865 billion (Q3 2025)
- Total equity: ▲€46 billion (2022)
- Number of employees: ▲46,959 (2022)
- Website: www.rabobank.com

Rabobank (Dutch pronunciation: [ˈraːboːbɑŋk]; full name: Coöperatieve Rabobank U.A.) is a Dutch multinational banking and financial services company headquartered in Utrecht, Netherlands. The group comprises 89 local Dutch Rabobanks (2019), a central organisation (Rabobank Nederland), and many specialised international offices and subsidiaries. Food and agribusiness constitute the primary international focus of the Rabobank Group. Rabobank is the second-largest bank in the Netherlands in terms of total assets.

In terms of Tier 1 capital, the organisation is among the 50 largest financial institutions in the world. As of 2022, total assets amount to €628 billion with a net profit of €2.7 billion.

Rabobank has been designated as a Significant Institution since the entry into force of European Banking Supervision in late 2014, and as a consequence is directly supervised by the European Central Bank.

== History ==
Rooted in agriculture, Rabobank is set up as a federation of local credit unions that offer services to the local markets.

=== Creation of farmers' banks ===
The bank was rooted in the ideas of Friedrich Wilhelm Raiffeisen, the founder of the cooperative movement of credit unions, who in 1864 created the first farmers' bank in Germany. Being a countryside mayor he was confronted with the abject poverty of the farmers and their families. He tried to alleviate this need through charitable aid, but realised that self-reliance had more potential in the long run, and thus converted his charitable foundation into a farmers' bank in 1864. In doing so he created the Darlehnskassen-Verein, which collected the savings of countryside dwellers and provided enterprising farmers with loans.

This model found a lot of interest in the Netherlands at the end of the 19th century. One of the first of Raiffeisen's followers was Father Gerlacus van den Elsen, who stood at the basis of a number of local farmers' banks in the south of the Netherlands. The model caught on being championed by the clergy and the countryside elites. The mission of the farmers' lending banks was an idealistic one, but they always operated using strict business principles. The cooperative bank model assured a tight bond between invested capital and the community.

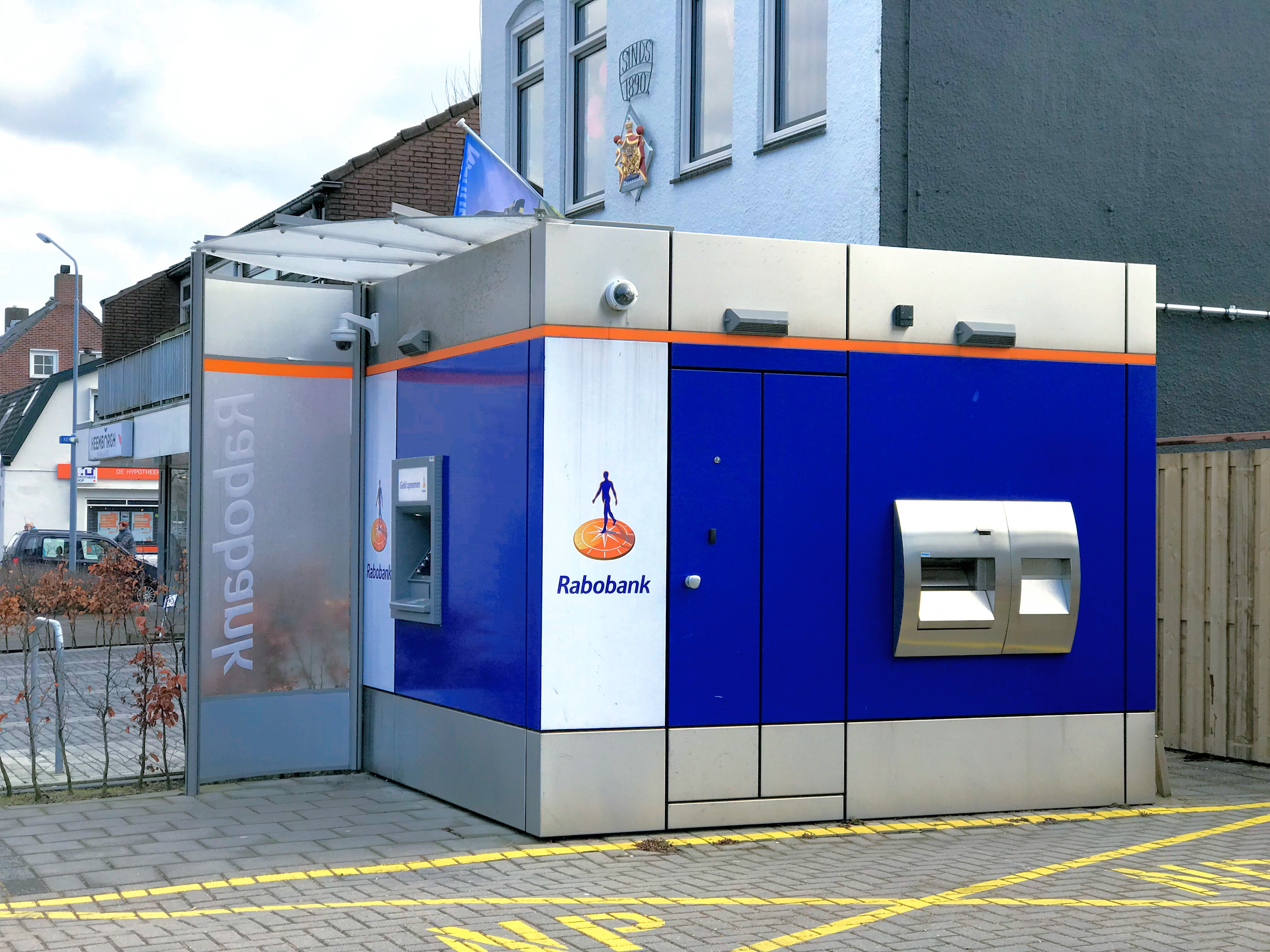
A Rabobank ATM in Nieuw-Vennep, Netherlands

=== Early cooperation ===
The bank's traditional headquarters are Utrecht and Eindhoven. In 1898, two cooperative bank conglomerates were formed:

- Coöperatieve Centrale Raiffeisen-Bank in Utrecht
- Coöperatieve Centrale Boerenleenbank in Eindhoven

Raiffeisen-Bank was formed as a cooperative of six local banks, while Boerenleenbank was a cooperative of 22 local banks. These two existed side by side for three-quarters of a century despite their obvious similarities. The reasons for this owe in part to legal disagreements. The most important difference, however, was cultural. The Eindhoven-based Boerenleenbank had a decidedly Catholic signature, while the Raiffeisen-Bank had a Protestant background. In the past the Netherlands underwent a process of pillarisation (Dutch: verzuiling), which in practice meant that members of different religious congregations and political movements essentially lived side by side, without contact between the two. A consequence of this pillarisation was that many villages hosted not one but two local banks, one each for Catholics and Protestants. The close-knit community banking that resulted helped these banks to better control their risks. Consequently, when the Dutch banking sector was devastated by a financial crisis in the early 1920s, these local banks survived largely unscathed. The religious backgrounds found their way to their organisational structures, as well; Boerenleenbank was highly centralised, while Raiffeisen-Bank promoted local autonomy.

=== Merger and overseas expansion ===
By 1940, the two organisations cooperated with each other, albeit on a limited scale. Three major developments caused a further tightening of the bonds between the two:

- An increase in the number of branches, leading to increased local competition
- A gradual fading of the confessional differences between the two
- An increasing demand for capital in the Dutch industry, which in turn led to higher concentration in the banking business

In 1972, the two organisations merged to form Coöperatieve Centrale Raiffeisen-Boerenleenbank, or Rabobank for short. The organisation chose Amsterdam to be its statutory headquarters due to its historical neutrality in relation to the founding organisations. From 1980 to 2015, the central organisation was referred to as Rabobank Nederland.

In 1980, Rabobank expanded its international activities as part of its mission to finance global agriculture. In 1990, it established a joint-venture bank in Indonesia by partnering with a local bank, Bank Duta, to form RabobankDuta. Bank Duta subsequently collapsed in the 1998 Asian financial crisis, and Rabobank bought Duta's share to operate solely as PT Bank Rabobank International Indonesia. In 1994, it purchased Primary Industry Bank of Australia (PIBA), which had operations in Australia and New Zealand, and renamed it Rabobank Australia Limited in 2003. In 1997, it purchased New Zealand–based Wrightson Farmers Finance Limited and renamed it Rabobank New Zealand in 1999. Rabobank became a significant lender to the rural sector in New Zealand with this purchase and used this as a base to expand its lending business further.

In Europe, Rabobank in 1992 purchased Allgemeine Deutsche Credit-Anstalt, a German bank.

=== 21st century ===
In 2002, Rabobank launched a new internet only savings bank called Rabobank.be. A second online savings banks was launched in 2005 in Ireland under the name of RaboDirect, and then as RaboPlus in New Zealand and two years later in Australia. After a small hiatus new online banks were opened in Poland (2011) and Germany (2012). The advertising campaigns used to promote the savings business in Ireland and New Zealand raised the profile of Rabobank generally in those countries resulting in an increase in not only its savings business but also in its lending businesses. In 2010, Rabobank decided to use the same brand name in Australia and New Zealand for the savings bank and replaced RaboPlus with RaboDirect in these countries. In 2014, Rabobank worked with Vasco, now OneSpan, to create a new online authentication system using QR codes.

Rabobank purchased Australian company Lend Lease Agro Business in 2003. In 2008, it expanded its operations in Indonesia by buying two retail banks, Bank Haga and Bank Hagakita. In the United States, Rabobank completed the acquisition of Mid-State Bank & Trust on May 1, 2007, which allows Rabo to expand its services to the Central Coast region of California, United States. In 2010, it also acquired Pacific State Bank, expanding into the Central Valley of California. Utrecht-America Holdings, Inc. and Rabobank N.A. operate as subsidiaries of the Rabobank Group in the United States. In 2019, it was announced that Rabobank sold its American retail business to Mechanics Bank, with all Rabobank branches taking the Mechanics name. Rabobank will continue to do business in North America related to Food and Agriculture based-lending under its subsidiary Rabo AgriFinance.

In June 2012, rating agency Moody's downgraded Rabobank's to Aa2 (previously Aaa), with a negative outlook. Due to a new rating methodology in November 2011 by rating agency Standard & Poor's, the credit status was downgraded two steps from AAA to AA. In November 2014, S&P lowered the rating from AA− to A+ with a negative outlook. Rating agency Fitch rates the credit status of the bank AA−, with a negative outlook.

As per the new strategy, Rabobank is planning to exit some markets. In September 2014, Rabobank sold BGZ Bank to BNP Paribas for $1.39 billion. Unlike most major banks, Rabobank's central organisation was originally a subsidiary of the local branches. However, new banking regulations made a new arrangement necessary. In late 2015, on the recommendation of a specially-created Governance Committee, Rabobank's 106 cooperative banks voted unanimously to merge with Rabobank Nederland. The merger took effect on 1 January 2016. While the 106 Rabobanks still have considerable autonomy, the central organisation is now the parent body. A 2013 scandal resulted in a $1 billion fine for unscrupulous trading practices, which included the manipulation of LIBOR currency rates worldwide. Chief Executive Piet Moerland resigned immediately as a result. In December 2015, Rabobank announced to cut 9,000 jobs by 2018 (3,000 jobs by the end of 2016) and almost a fifth of its current workforce. The policy was to comply with the tougher Basel IV rulebook. By 2019, Rabobank had offices in 38 countries.

== Organisation structure ==
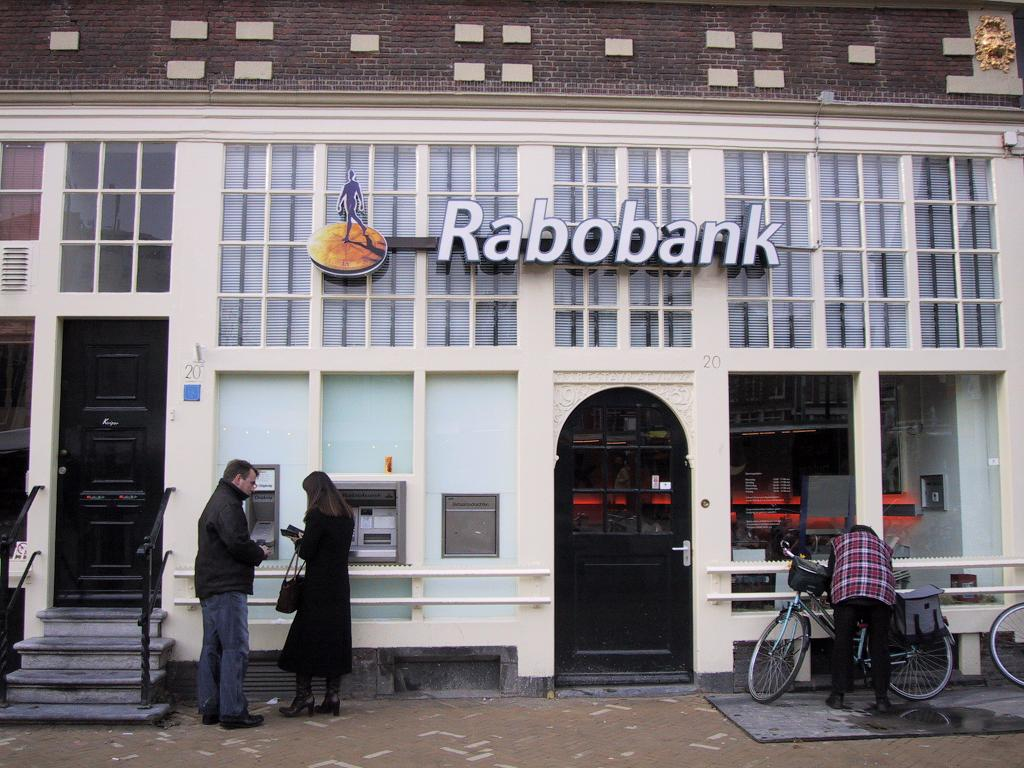
Branch of Rabobank in Amsterdam

The Rabobank Group consists of a network of local banks, Rabobank Nederland and several daughter organisations.

Previously, the local Rabobanks were the mother organisation of Rabobank Nederland, their central organisation. The local banks were facilitated by Rabobank Nederland to serve their customers, not the other way around as is often the case with traditional banking organisations. Employees of the group did not routinely speak of a headquarters but preferred to speak of Rabobank Nederland, which was their daughter organisation. In 2016, however, the local banks merged with Rabobank Nederland, while retaining significant independence.

Even before 2016, the central organisation occasionally overruled the autonomy of the local bank organisations. In accordance with Dutch regulations in the field of credit and financial services Rabobank Nederland oversees that the local banks maintain a required level of prudence and professionalism while selling financial products. This has grown to be especially important in view of international standards such as Sarbanes–Oxley Act, Basel II and IFRS. This leads to a rather unusual phenomenon within international business: the mother companies and the much larger daughter are essentially forced to coexist in order to function properly. This has led to a very ambivalent relationship between the two over the years.

At the time of the merger there were five management instruments within Rabobank Nederland:

1. Algemene Vergadering – general assembly. The boards of all local banks within the cooperation were represented there.
2. De Centrale Kringvergadering – advisory board staffed by representatives of clusters of local banks.
3. De Hoofddirectie – general management. Theoretically they were an autonomous management organ, but in practice, they had to pay 'serious consideration' to what the 4th organ; Raad van Beheer; thought about the course of action for the organisation.
4. Raad van Beheer – management council. An independent advisory council whose chairman also attended the meetings of De Hoofddirectie.
5. Raad van Toezicht – supervisory board

In 2002 this structure was simplified. The Raad van Beheer was disbanded. De Hoofddirectie received an integral authority over the banking business. It was also renamed to Raad van Bestuur or board of directors. They have an added task compared to a traditional board i.e., they are expected to look out for the specific interests of the members (local banks and their certificate holders). The Raad van Toezicht was renamed to county commission and now held an independent supervisory role. The chairman of this board also presides over the Centrale Kringvergadering. The latter is the most distinguishing organ as compared to other financial institutions in the Netherlands and abroad.

== Market position ==
Rabobank's former footprint within the United States, all of the banks in the United States operated by Rabobank were located in the state of California

Rabobank is traditionally a farmers' bank and it still holds an 85% to 90% market share in the agrarian sector in the Netherlands. Throughout the years, the company has also started targeting small and medium-sized companies. By the mid 1970s the market share in this sector reached some 30% and currently amounts to approximately 40%. In 1987, an important milestone was reached; the total outstanding loans in sectors other than agriculture exceeded those in the agricultural sector for the first time. By 2005 the agricultural credits amounted to some 8% of total outstanding credit.

Rabobank also holds some 40% of the total outstanding sums on Dutch savings accounts and they account for approximately 30% of all private consumer mortgages in the Netherlands.

In the Netherlands, Rabobank is the third-largest retail bank by market share, and second largest by number of current accounts at 30%. ING Group is the largest with 40% of current accounts, followed by Rabobank (30%), ABN AMRO (20%), and others (10%).

The Rabobank Group currently consists of the following divisions:

- Rabobank Nederland – the facilitary and staff organisation that serves the local banks. It currently performs the following core activities:
  - Market (staff) support for the domestic retail banking business
  - Group functions i.e., ICT, Legal and other facilitary departments
  - Wholesale banking and international rural and retail banking
- Local Banks – Approximately 89 cooperative local banks in the Netherlands
- Rabo Wholesale Rural & Retail – Rabobank's wholesale banking and investment division
- Rabo Vastgoed Groep – Project developer, real estate
- DLL (De Lage Landen) – vendor finance, leasing and trade finance
- Rembrandt Fusies & Overnames – corporate finance
- Schretlen & Co – asset management, private banking sector
- Obvion – mortgage intermediary
- Rabobank Ireland plc
- Rabobank New Zealand Limited - a registered bank in New Zealand
- Rabo AgriFinance, headquartered in St Louis, Missouri
- ACC Loan Management, Ireland
- Utrecht-America Holdings, Inc. - New York City-based U.S. financial holding company
- Rabo Mobiel – a mobile virtual network operator in the Netherlands (2005–2014)
- Rabo Partnerships, with advisory services and minority participations in various international markets, including: Tanzania, Zambia, Malawi, Mozambique, Ecuador, Brazil and Paraguay.

== RaboDirect ==
RaboDirect, formerly RaboPlus in some locations is the brand name for online-only services offered by Rabobank. RaboDirect operates in Belgium, the Republic of Ireland, Australia, New Zealand and Germany offering savings accounts, term deposits and managed funds. In Belgium it is known as Rabobank.be.

=== Ireland ===
RaboDirect Ireland was an online savings bank. In 2009, RaboDirect ran the marketing campaign that included TV commercials which featured staff confessing truths about themselves, and a microsite called Truthbank where customers could "confess" their own truths. RaboDirect was the sponsor of rugby union's Pro12 from the 2011-12 season until 2013–14, it featured teams from Ireland, Italy, Scotland and Wales. The deal was announced in June 2011, during which time the league was known as the RaboDirect Pro12. On 21 February RaboDirect announced that it would be closing down its Irish operations from 16 May 2018, with the loss of 31 jobs.

=== New Zealand ===
RaboDirect, originally known as RaboPlus, was launched in February 2006 and was at the time only bank in New Zealand whose parent company was rated AAA by Standard & Poor's (the credit rating has since been downgraded and as of October 2015 is A).

=== Australia ===
On 23 May 2007, Rabobank opened a RaboPlus Internet bank in Australia. On 20 May 2010, the services were rebranded to RaboDirect. RaboDirect is the major partner of the Melbourne Rebels Super Rugby side. By 2011 over $6 billion had been gathered in deposits.

=== Germany ===
On 20 June 2012, Rabobank opened a RaboDirect in Germany. Rabobank has had a presence in Germany since 1984. It has operated in the field of corporate finance and has been primarily active in the food and agriculture sector in the country.

=== Poland ===
Rabobank operated a direct bank in Poland, but under the Bank BGZ operation and using the name "BGZ Optima". The Polish business including BGZ Optima was subsequently sold to French bank BNP Paribas in December 2013 for around $1.4 billion.

== Naming rights ==
Rabobank has naming rights to several venues and organizations, including:

- Rabobank Stadium, Salinas, California
- Rabobank Development Team, cycling team
- Rabobank-Liv/giant, cycling team
- Rabobank Bestuurscentrum, skyscraper, Utrecht

== Controversies ==
=== Libor scandal ===
The major investment banks in London report daily the interest on short-term loans that they charge each other. This concerns short-term interest periods from 1 day to 1 year. When it emerged that some banks had deliberately stated this interest rate too high or too low since 1991, the Libor scandal was born. Because the Libor interest rate is also used in the United States to calculate the price of derivatives, American regulators also took action. Barclays and UBS were the first two participants, settling for $460 million and $1,500 million respectively. RBS was fined $612 million.

On 29 October 2013 it was published that the Rabobank had reached an agreement with De Nederlandsche Bank (DNB), the Dutch Justice Department (OM), the Financial Conduct Authority (FCA) in the United Kingdom, the Commodity Futures Trading Commission (CFTC) in the United States, the United States Department of Justice (DOJ) and the Japanese Financial Services Authority (JFSA). This is in connection with their investigations into Rabobank's submission procedures with regard to the London Interbank Offered Rate (Libor) and the Euro Interbank Offered Rate (Euribor) in the past. Rabobank agreed to pay settlement amounts to OM, FCA, CFTC and DOJ totalling approximately EUR 774 million. Of this, 70 million euros went to the Dutch Public Prosecution Service. In return, no criminal investigation followed. The Dutch Central Bank also took measures. CEO Piet Moerland resigned early.

=== Money laundering ===
In February 2018, Rabobank reached a settlement with the United States Department of Justice for 298 million euros. The bank did not have its internal controls in order, resulting in hundreds of millions of dollars in drug money being laundered through the American Rabobank subsidiary RNA in California.

=== Deforestation ===
The Bankrolling Ecosystem Destruction report from a coalition of civil society organizations shows how much money is flowing from EU-based financial institutions to sectors that pose a risk to ecosystems, including $30.9 million from Rabobank. The report highlights the importance of EU regulation of the financial sector to align financing with global 1.5 °C and biodiversity targets.

Rabobank has received criticism because the bank was involved in financing hundreds of farmers who committed illegal deforestation in Brazil. This is contrary to the official policy as communicated by the bank. Research links Rabobank's investments to the loss of approximately 390,000 ha of Amazon or Cerrado forest (2000–2022). Rabobank has been placed on the list of major polluters of the Dutch NGO Milieudefensie because the bank would have invested more than 1.4 billion euros in companies involved in deforestation in the period from 2015 to 2022.

== Sustainability ==
Rabobank states that it wants to contribute to the sustainable development of society in an economic, social and ecological sense. This is enshrined, among other things, in the Code of Conduct and in general external and internal principles for the provision of services. Corporate social responsibility is a basic principle in Rabobank's core activities. Rabobank continues to finance global meat and dairy corporations and thus drives climate change and deforestation.

=== Climate ===
In contrast to the positive publicity from Rabobank, there is criticism from society about its role in the Dutch nitrogen crisis. For example, the World Wildlife Fund (NL) wrote in an open letter that Rabobank must take its responsibility in realizing an agricultural transition to improve nature, the living environment and the agricultural sector. The House of Representatives asked the cabinet in a motion to investigate whether banks such as Rabobank could be forced to contribute to solving the nitrogen crisis.

The bank refused loans to projects with alternative agricultural methods, which led to forced expansion of Dutch livestock farms. Only about 3% of the outstanding 30 billion in the agricultural sector belongs to organically operating companies, farmers receive little or no support in the transition to more sustainable agriculture and livestock farming. Rabobank still invests in expensive techniques, not in solving but in technically mitigating the negative consequences of mass livestock farming and economies of scale.

Extinction Rebellion and Greenpeace issued an ultimatum to Rabobank in 2023 to stop financing industrial agriculture, to which the bank did not respond. A mass protest followed in which activists blocked the head office in Utrecht.

== See also ==
- List of European cooperative banks
- List of banks in the euro area
- List of banks in the Netherlands
