= Bond equivalent yield =

The bond equivalent yield (BEY) for an investment is a calculated annual percentage yield for an investment, which may not pay out yearly. It is not to be confused with a bond's coupon rate. This allows investments with different payout frequencies to be compared.
