= Cullinan Finance =

HSBC structured investment vehicle

Cullinan Finance was a Structured investment vehicle (SIV) run by HSBC with total asset portfolio around US$27 billion.

It was established in 2005. As of 2007 it was managed by a team led by Dominic Swan, who previously led the SIV-rating department at Moody's.

It was notable for growing faster than any other SIV so far and was as of 2007 one of the six largest SIVs.

On 26 November 2007, HSBC announced that it would rescue two SIV's, Cullinan Finance and Asscher, by moving them onto its balance sheet and providing up to $35 billion.

As of 2008, Cullinan Finance Limited is in liquidation.
