= Mary Cullinan =

American academic administrator (1950–2021)

- Born: December 23, 1950
- Died: May 3, 2021 (aged 70)

Academic background
- Education: University of Pennsylvania (BA); University of Wisconsin–Madison (MA, PhD)

Academic work
- Institutions: California State University, Hayward (1991–1996); California State University, Stanislaus (1996–2003); Stephen F. Austin State University (2003–2006)

26th President of Eastern Washington University
- In office 2014–2020
- Preceded by: Rodolfo Arevalo
- Succeeded by: David May (acting)

President of Southern Oregon University
- In office 2006–2014

Mary Cullinan (December 23, 1950 – May 3, 2021) was an American academic administrator who served as the 26th president of Eastern Washington University from 2014 to 2020.

== Early life and education ==
Cullinan was raised in Washington, D.C. Her father was Assistant Postmaster-General under President Dwight D. Eisenhower and later a speech writer for various senators, congressmen, and other influential politicians, including Presidents John F. Kennedy and Lyndon B. Johnson. She graduated, magna cum laude, with a degree in English from the University of Pennsylvania in 1972. Cullinan obtained her master's degree in 1973 and her PhD in 1978 in English literature at the University of Wisconsin–Madison.

== Career ==
After becoming a tenured professor of English at California State University, Hayward (now CSU East Bay) in 1991, she received her first administrative position as chair of the department of English at the university (1991–1992; 1993–1994). At California State University–Hayward, she was also interim dean of the School of Arts, Letters, and Social Sciences (1992–1993) and director of the Office of Faculty Development and Faculty Center for Excellence in Teaching (1994–1996).

Later, she served as dean of the College of Arts, Letters and Sciences and English professor at California State University, Stanislaus from 1996 to 2003. She served as provost and vice president for academic affairs as well as professor of English at Stephen F. Austin State University from 2003 to 2006.

From 2006 to 2014, Cullinan was the president of Southern Oregon University in Ashland, Oregon. She was responsible for authoring the two largest retrenchment programs in the history of the university.

Cullinan stepped down as president of Eastern Washington University in Cheney, Washington, on August 4, 2020. On September 29, 2020, it was announced that Cullinan would become a tenured professor, remaining at Eastern Washington University within the English department within the College of Arts, Letters, and Education.

== Controversy ==
In the spring of 2014 the faculty of Southern Oregon University held a vote of no confidence in Cullinan and two of her top administrators. 83% of the faculty participated in the vote, with 76% of that faculty voting no confidence in Cullinan's leadership.

On June 22, 2020, Cullinan faced a similar scenario at Eastern Washington University, where she received a second vote of no confidence by a 35–2 vote in the Faculty Senate. In a memo by the faculty senate, signed by professors Nick Jackson, Kelly Evans and Tony Flinn, it was stated that Cullinan was not trusted "to provide effective leadership nor to make the important decisions necessary, especially if she is granted the power of severe financial crisis by the (board of trustees)." Cullinan officially resigned from the university on August 4, 2020.

== Awards ==
In 2011 Cullinan received from the CASE District VIII Leader of the Year from the Council for the Advancement and Support of Higher Education.

== Books ==
- "Susan Ferrier", G. K. Hall & Co. (1984)
- "Business English for Industry and the Professions", Dryden Press (1986)
- "American Women Writers: Diverse Voices in Prose Since 1845" [ed. with E. Barrett]. St. Martin's Press (1992)
- "Business Communication: Principles and Processes", second edition. Harcourt Brace Jovanovich (1993). First edition: Holt, Rinehart & Winston (1988)
