= Rabobank Bestuurscentrum =

Skyscraper in Utrecht, Netherlands

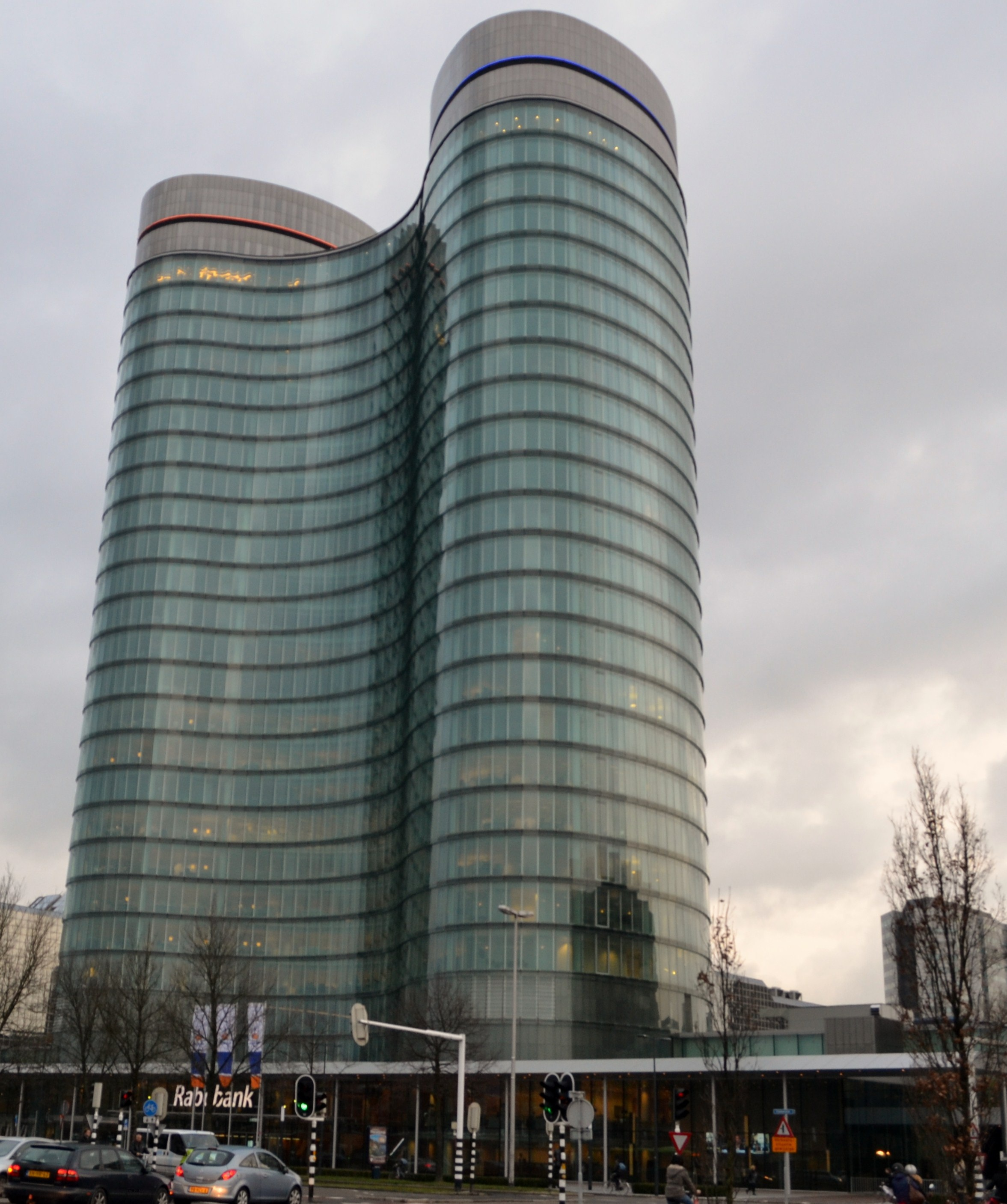
- The Rabotoren in January 2012
- Interactive map of the Rabobank Bestuurscentrum area

General information
- Coordinates: 52°05′13″N 5°06′31″E

Height
- Height: 105 metres (344 ft)

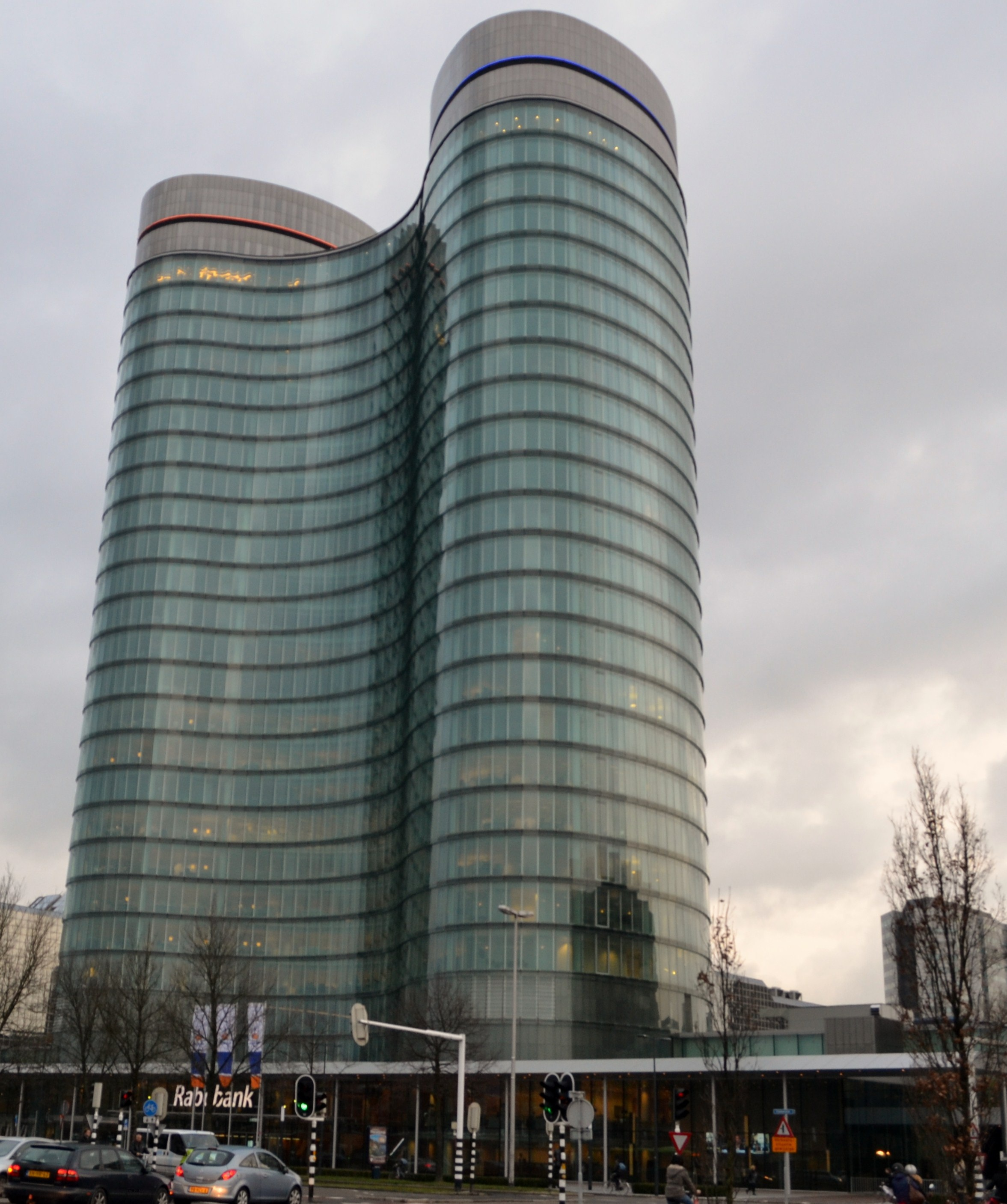
The Rabotoren in January 2012

The Rabobank Bestuurscentrum or Rabotoren (English: Rabobank Executive Centre or Rabotower) is a skyscraper in the Dutch city of Utrecht, built between 2007 and 2011 and designed by the architectural firm Kraaijvanger Urbis. At 105 metres (344 ft), it is the tallest office building in the city, and the second tallest building overall in Utrecht after the Dom Tower.
