= Thomas A. Cullinan =

Thomas Allen Cullinan
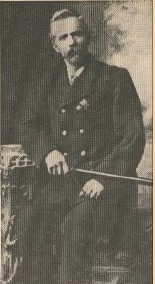
- Thomas Allen Cullinan, also known as Marshal Tom Allen of Junction City, Kansas (1838-1904)
- Born: 1838; Kilrush, Ireland
- Died: June 18, 1904 (aged 65–66); Kansas City, Missouri
- Occupation: Marshal

Thomas Allen Cullinan (1838 – June 18, 1904), also known as Tom Allen, was a law enforcement officer in Kansas. He served as city marshal of Junction City, Kansas, from 1871 to 1904. Before that he was a seaman, miner, fur trapper and hunter. He served in the Union Army during the American Civil War.

== Early life ==
Tom Allen was born in Kilrush, Ireland in 1838 to well-to-do parents.

== Career ==
=== Young seaman and pilot ===
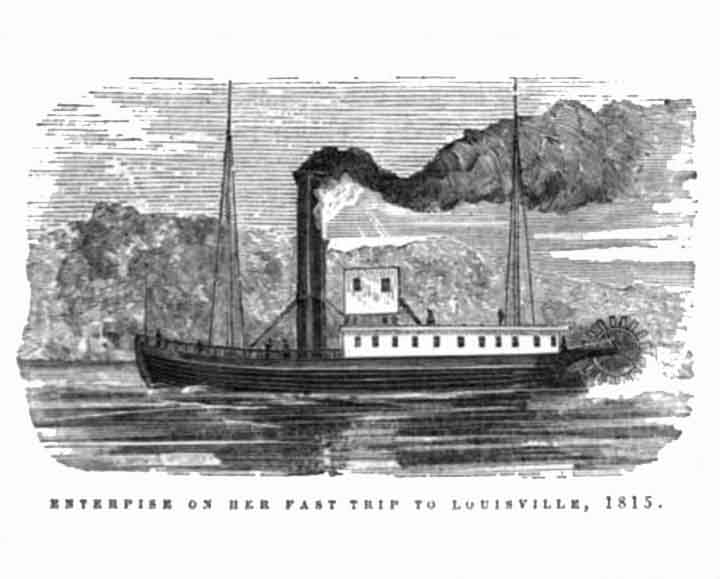
A Mississippi River Boat, 1815

When he was eleven years old, he became a seaman and spent six years exploring the world. He worked at first for the English revenue service, where he visited ports in British Isles, France, Hamburg, and the Mediterranean. He then went to the East and West Indies and South America. During that time he learned how to navigate and take charge of a ship. In 1854, he was in Crimea and the following year he worked on a passenger ship from Liverpool to New York. He then traveled within the United States as a seaman on the Great Lakes. During that time, he survived a shipwreck on Lake Erie and also became a proficient Mississippi River pilot.

=== Fur trapper and hunter ===
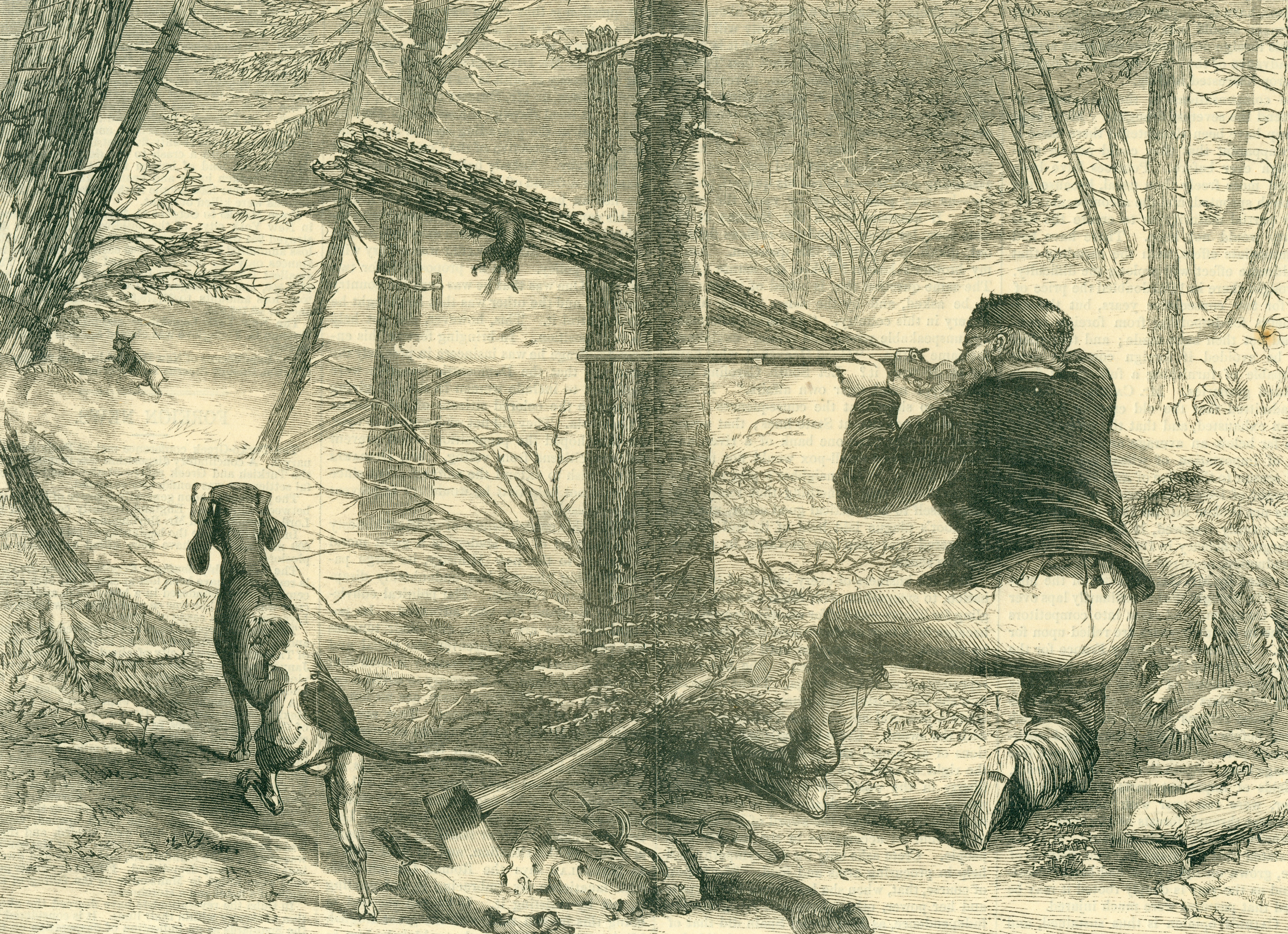
"The Fur Trapper", Harper's Weekly, January 23, 1869

In 1857, he was an employee of the American Fur Company and traveled to the Rocky Mountains. He hunted and trapped animals from Yellowstone to the Taos Valley. During the summer of 1858, he spent some time at a ranch in New Mexico on the Cimarron River owned by Lucien Maxwell and Kit Carson. Both ranchers offered Allen a job as a partner, but Allen refused.

=== Miner and explorer ===
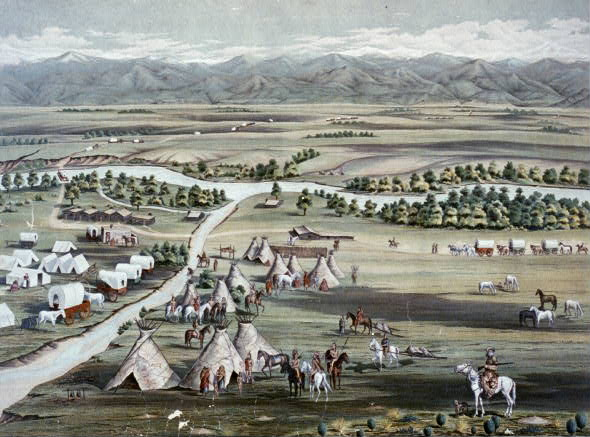
Denver, 1859

Tom Allen traveled to the Denver region and became a miner. Moreover, he staked a claim with three other men to land extending 90 acres (360,000 m^{2}). There was a dispute to the ownership of the land and the four men (including Allen) reinforced their collective stake by erecting a large log house with firing ports in each wall. The land dispute progressed to the point where a company of 80 armed men were dispatched to remove Allen and his co-claimants. Allen allowed one of the armed men to step forward and revealed the defenses placed on the land. The armed man reported back and everyone in the 80-strong company decided to leave. Oddly enough, the land in what is now downtown Denver was eventually sold for a meager amount of money to Francis J. Marshall.

Allen was involved in his first major fistfight during his stay in Denver. When he saw a gentleman publicly strike a woman, Allen challenged the assailant to a no-holds-barred confrontation. Afterwards, Allen lectured the attacker for an hour and a half on the evils of domestic violence.

A man known as the "Terror of the Gulch" attempted to steal Tom Allen's sluice water. As a result, Allen attempted to settle the matter diplomatically. This option ultimately failed and Allen offered to solve the dispute either "according to the rules of the ring" or through "rough-and-tumble." The Terror chose the latter, which allowed for the use of fighting techniques such as eye-gouging, biting, stomping, and head butting. A crowd emerged as Allen demonstrated the dynamics of "rough-and-tumble." In the end, the "Terror of the Gulch" was beaten and left the area.

=== Explorer ===
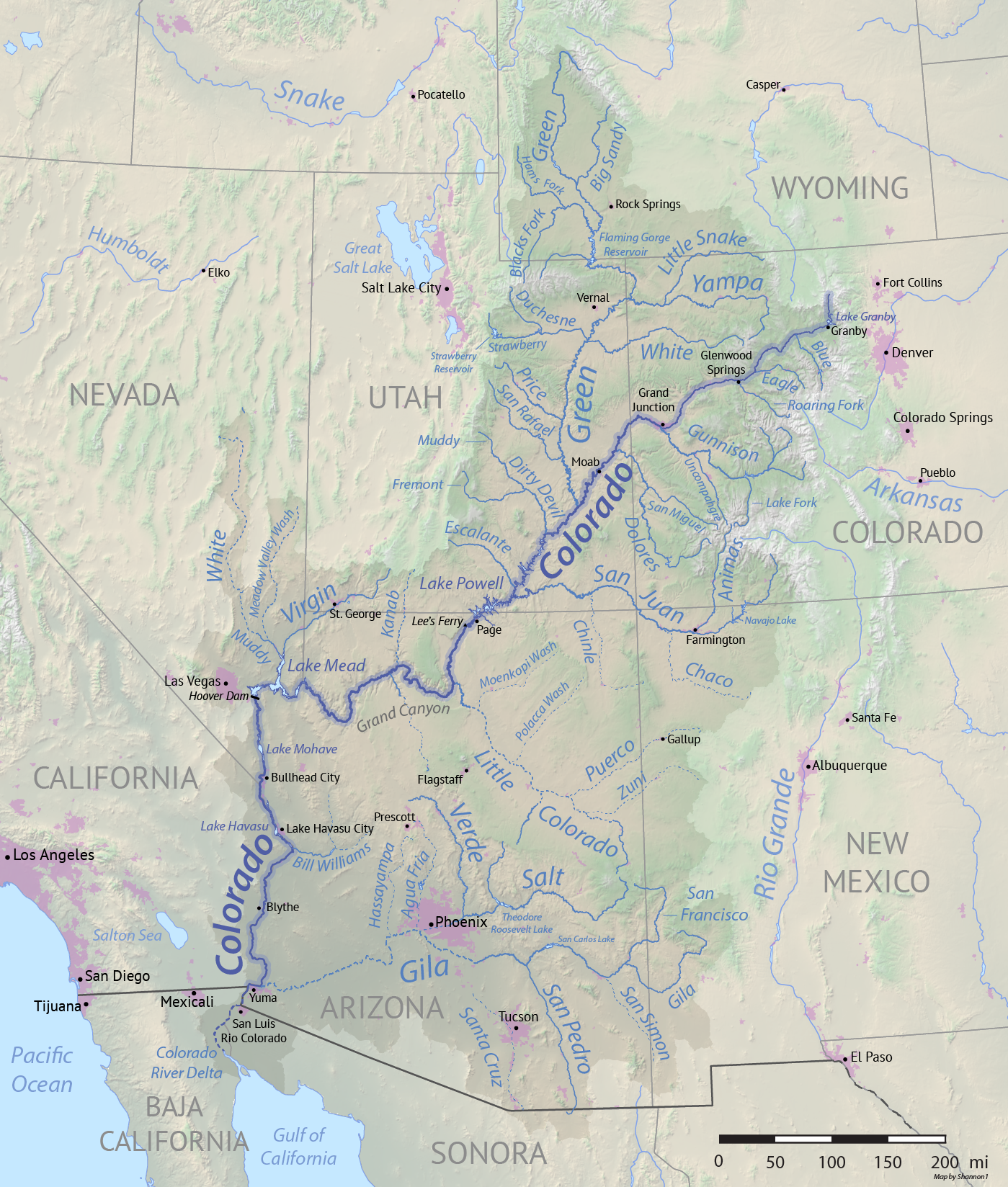
Colorado River map

Many merchants in Denver employed Allen and two of his land co-claimants, Jack Menzies and David Thompson, to explore the Colorado River. This expedition took place eight years before the explorations of Major John Wesley Powell. Unfortunately, Allen and his associates were captured by the Native American Utes after only 250 miles (400 km) into their expedition. When one of the tribesmen pulled Allen's ear, Allen punched the Ute and made him fall to the ground. Afterwards, Allen told the chief in Spanish that the Utes were cowards and that he could defeat the tribe's best warrior. Unfortunately, there is no confirmation as to whether the chief fulfilled Allen's request or was merely amused by Allen's bravado. Overall, Allen and his land co-claimants were set free. He returned to Leavenworth.

=== Civil War ===
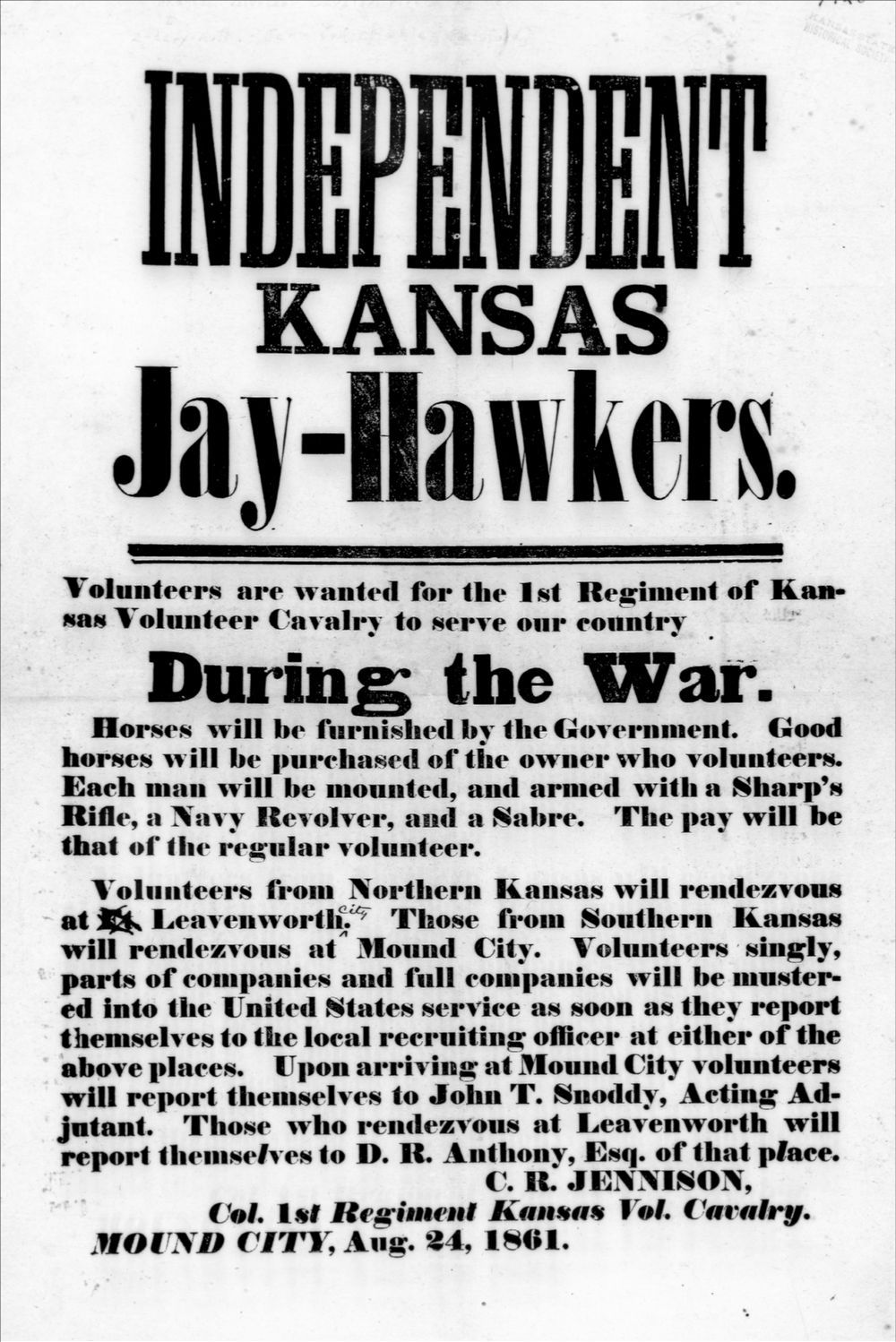
Broadside recruiting men for the Independent Kansas Jayhawkers, 1st Kansas Volunteer Cavalry

During the American Civil War, Allen enlisted in the Union Army as a scout in the eastern states. He served with St. Clair and "Red Clark", riding through Kansas, Missouri, Mississippi, Louisiana, and Tennessee.

In 1863, he was in Leavenworth, Kansas, when the town was occupied by a group of paramilitary units known as the Jayhawkers. Two police officers were shot and the town marshal was forced to leave. Upon the urgent request of the authorities, Allen decided to become chief of police. Allen faced the Jayhawkers using his "rough-and-tumble" techniques. In thirty days, he restored order to Leavenworth and afterwards relinquished his position.

=== Junction City marshal ===
After the war and until 1871, he came to Junction City and had contracts to supply meat to the military and railroad construction crews. In 1871, he became the city marshal of Junction City. The mayor, George Martin, stated that "The post was not a sinecure." Various brothels and saloons elicited rabble rousing troops from Fort Riley, as well as travelers coming from intersecting railway lines.

The city's newspaper, the Junction City Union, reported the following on April 25, 1885:

We never heard of another single officer who could corral or lock up a gang of six or seven men at once. Tom Allen has done it frequently. One evening a couple of years ago six men came from a hay camp at Riley with the purpose of having a time. The marshal warned them not to attempt it. They started along the street overturning boxes and disturbing everybody. He overtook them and in less time than we can tell it four of them lay on the ground. Another time he took without assistance six soldiers out of a gang of eight, shooting two of them slightly. In all his service he has never killed a man, although suffering at times great aggravation and taking desperate chances.

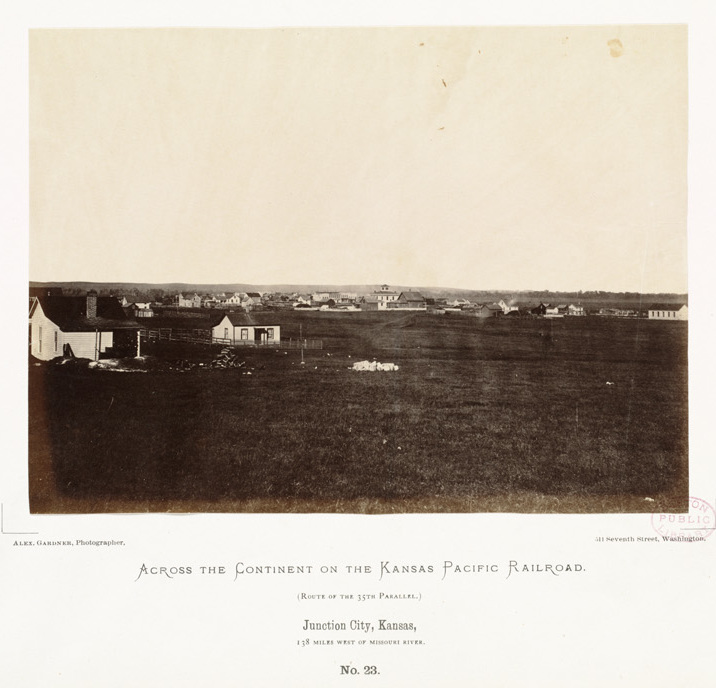
Junction City, Kansas, from the railroad, 1867. Boston Public Library

Of the many exploits Tom Allen had while he was the city marshal of Junction City, a recruit from Fort Riley (along with twelve companions) intended to pull back Allen's ears. As a result, the recruit was injured and sent back to Fort Riley in an ambulance. In another incident, Allen entered a saloon while it was being vandalized by eight soldiers. Allen defeated each soldier and dragged seven of them to the jail. The eighth one managed to escape. Allen went to Fort Riley the next morning in order to arrest the eighth soldier. When the captain learned that Allen was present, he stated: "Great Scott, that's the man who licked my sergeant! He can have him."

Allen confronted a drifter that according to newspaper accounts executed "a beastly offense to a little girl." Allen faced the six-foot man and decided to punish him with physical force instead of having him go to court. In another incident, a drunk which Allen imprisoned multiple times started a quarrel in a local pub and according to the Junction City Union, "stood out in the street with a rock in each hand when Tom arrived. 'Looking for a fight, are you? Remarked the peace officer as he gave him a wipe on the jaw, knocking him down and punishing him severely. This individual has never drank a drop since, and has thanked Tom repeatedly for that thrashing."

A tall red-headed stranger entered Junction City in 1884. While in a general store, he created panic when he held his Colt revolver at the patrons. Allen warned the man to take the next train that was leaving in a half-hour. The man ignored Allen and during evening hours, he started a commotion at a hotel. Allen again told the redheaded man to leave town. The next day, the man was causing an uproar at a cheap, dingy drinking establishment. Allen finally intervened and said, "Now I will take you in." On his way to prison, the redheaded man stated to Allen, "You're not man enough to take me in" and slapped him. As a result, Allen was irate, thrashed the man in a bloody fight, disarmed his Colt, and threw him in a prison cell. Afterwards, Allen threw the blood-encrusted man into the next train. Mayor George Martin stated, "I think this was his last experience with amateur prize-fighters who came to test his mettle." For thirty-three years, Tom Allen served as city marshal in Junction City. During his many confrontations, he was not responsible for a single death and was never injured.

== Personal life ==
Allen was married in 1865. In 1885, he had a wife and seven children and a 200-acre farm halfway between Junction City, Kansas and Fort Riley. He died on June 18, 1904, in a Kansas City, Missouri, hospital.
