= Mutan rate =

Japanese overnight bank loan rate

The Mutan interest rate is the un-collateralized overnight call rate in Japan. It is the reference rate for JPY overnight unsecured transactions in the Japanese market. It was launched in July 1985 and it is the main tool for the transmission of the Bank of Japan's monetary policy. Mutan rate and TONA rate are the same things.

== Publication ==
Bank of Japan publishes a provisional rate, rounded to three decimal places, every business day around 17:15 JST (or 18:15 JST for the last business day of the month). A final result is published the following business day around 10:00 JST. The results published contain weighted-average, highest, and lowest rate during the business day.

== See also ==
- EONIA
- SONIA
- SARON
- Federal funds rate
- Interbank lending market
