= SELIC =

Brazilian interbank loan rate

By jurisdiction
- Federal funds rate (US Federal Reserve overnight rate)
- SOFR (Secured Overnight Financing Rate; calculated by the New York Fed)
- SELIC (Brazilian Real OverNight index rate)
- €STR (Euro Short Term Rate)
- SONIA (Sterling OverNight Index Average)
- SARON (Swiss Average Rate OverNight)
- TONAR (Tokyo Overnight Average Rate - Japanese Uncollateralised Overnight Call Rate)
- LIBOR (London Interbank Offered Rate - quotes in USD in London money market)
- EURIBOR (Euro Interbank Offered Rate)
- SHIBOR (Shanghai Interbank Offered Rate)
- ZARONIA (South African Rand Overnight Index Average)

The Sistema Especial de Liquidação e Custodia (SELIC) (Special System for Settlement and Custody) is the Brazilian Central Bank's system for performing open market operations in execution of monetary policy. The SELIC rate is the Bank's overnight rate.

Selic launched on November 14, 1979, and is a computerized system intended for the registration, custody and settlement of public securities issued by the National Treasury.

Only financial institutions accredited by the Central Bank of Brazil have access to Selic, which operates in real time, allowing businesses to have same-day settlement. The operators of the institutions involved in a transaction with these securities, after arranging the deals, transfer these operations, via terminal, to Selic. The system immediately transfers the title registration to the buyer and credits the title seller's account. Both parties receive a guarantee of the validity of the transaction carried out.

The securities are book-entry and managed by the Central Bank's Open Market Operations Department (Demab). Selic basically operates with bonds issued by the National Treasury, for the Central Bank of Brazil.
