= Euro short-term rate =

Reference rate for the euro

By jurisdiction
- Federal funds rate (US Federal Reserve overnight rate)
- SOFR (Secured Overnight Financing Rate; calculated by the New York Fed)
- SELIC (Brazilian Real OverNight index rate)
- €STR (Euro Short Term Rate)
- SONIA (Sterling OverNight Index Average)
- SARON (Swiss Average Rate OverNight)
- TONAR (Tokyo Overnight Average Rate - Japanese Uncollateralised Overnight Call Rate)
- LIBOR (London Interbank Offered Rate - quotes in USD in London money market)
- EURIBOR (Euro Interbank Offered Rate)
- SHIBOR (Shanghai Interbank Offered Rate)
- ZARONIA (South African Rand Overnight Index Average)

The Euro Short-Term Rate (€STR) is a reference rate for the euro. This interest rate can be used as the rate referenced in financial contracts that involve the euro. €STR is administered and calculated by the European Central Bank (ECB), based on the money market statistical reporting of the Eurosystem. According to the indications of the working group on euro risk-free rates, €STR replaced the Euro Overnight Index Average (EONIA) as the Euro risk-free rate for all products and contracts.

== History ==
20 September 2017: ECB's Governing Council decided to develop a euro short-term rate based on data collected by the Eurosystem for money market statistical purposes.

13 September 2018: the working group on euro risk-free rates recommended to replace the EONIA with the euro short-term rate.

12 March 2019: the ECB decided to use the acronym "€STR".

2 October 2019: the ECB started publishing the rate.

== Characteristics ==
Characteristics of the €STR:

- The €STR is published by the ECB.
- It is based on the unsecured market segment. The ECB developed an unsecured rate to replace EONIA. Furthermore, a secured rate would be affected by the type of the collaterals.
- The money market statistical reporting covers the 50 largest banks in the euro area in terms of balance sheet size.
- While EONIA reflected the interbank market, €STR extends the scope to money market funds, insurance companies and other financial corporations because banks developed significant money market activity with those entities.

The ISIN is EU000A2X2A25.

== Methodology ==
=== Overnight rate ===
The €STR is calculated using overnight unsecured fixed rate deposit transactions above €1 million.

For each TARGET business day the €STR is calculated as a volume-weighted trimmed mean.

Steps in the calculation:

- Ordering the transactions from lowest to highest rate.
- Aggregating the transactions at each rate level.
- Removing the top and bottom 25% in volume terms (trimming).
- Calculating the mean of the remaining 50%, rounding to the third decimal.

The €STR is published on every TARGET business day at 8:00 CET (reflecting the trading activity of the previous business day). If errors are detected, the €STR is revised and republished on the same day at 9:00 CET.

=== Forward-looking term structure ===
An OIS quotes-based methodology as the €STR-based forward-looking term structure methodology is recommended as a fallback to Euribor-linked contracts. The working group will analyse further approaches.

== See also ==
- SARON
- SOFR
- EONIA
