= List of acronyms associated with the eurozone crisis =

This is a list of acronyms and initialisms associated with the Euro area crisis.

== A ==
- ABS (Asset-backed security): financial instrument whose payments are collateralized ("backed") by a pool of underlying assets that are usually small, illiquid and unable to be sold individually - hence the process of securitization.
- ANFA (Agreement on Net Financial Assets): confidential agreement between ECB and national central banks concerning the purchase of sovereign debt (financial assets) by the central banks, such as the purchase of Greek debt paper, for the banks' own account - as opposed to SMP programs in which ECB or the central banks are operating within the Eurosystem.
- ARRA (American Recovery and Reinvestment Act; commonly called "the Stimulus Package”): legislation enacting net-deficit spending measures voted by the U.S. Congress and signed into law by President Barack Obama, in February 2009, often compared with stimulus measures undertaken by Eurozone member-states.

== B ==
- Basel III, the third framework developed by the Basel Committee on Banking Supervision that sets international standards for bank capital adequacy, bank stress tests, and accounting liquidity requirements. It was in response to the deficiencies in financial regulation revealed by the 2008 financial crisis. See CET1.
- Brexit or Brixit (British exit): term initially introduced in 2012 in world business trading, referring to the possibility that the United Kingdom could leave the European Union. Following the 2016 referendum, Britain exited from the European Union at 23:00 GMT on 31 January 2020, and, from then on, the term denotes a real event.

== C ==
- CAC 1. Collective action clause: agreement in the issuance of bonds that allows a supermajority of bondholders to agree to a debt restructuring that is legally binding on all holders of the bond, including those who vote against the restructuring. 2. Capital account convertibility : the extent to which a nation's financial regime allows transactions of local financial assets into foreign financial assets freely and at market-determined exchange rates.
- CAR (Capital Adequacy Ratio, aka Capital-to-Risk Weighted Assets Ratio or CRAR): the ratio of a bank's capital to its risk.
- CDO (Collateralized debt obligation): type of structured asset-backed security (see ABS) with multiple tranches, issued by special purpose entities and collateralized by debt obligations, including bonds and/or loans. Each tranche offers a varying degree of risk and return so as to meet investor demand. CDOs' value & payments are derived from a portfolio of fixed-income underlying assets.
- CDS (Credit default swap): financial agreement whereby one side (the seller of the CDS) agrees to compensate the other side (the CDS buyer) in the event of a loan default or other credit event. The buyer makes a series of payments (called "fee" or "spread") to the seller and, in exchange, receives a payoff if the loan defaults. An LCDS (Loan-only credit default swap) is a CDS whose underlying security is strictly a syndicated, secured loan, and never a bond.
- CEBS (Committee of European Banking Supervisors): former independent advisory committee of the European Union (EU), tasked with banking supervision within the EU. Predecessor of the European Banking Authority (EBA).
- CET1 (Common Equity Tier 1): percentage of bank capital that B III standards require banks to fund with RWAs (risk-weighted assets) composed of shareholders' equity, including audited profits, goodwill, and other intangible assets - less accounting reserves that are not loss absorbing. Currently, and since 2015, it stands at 4.5%.
- CFS (Center for Financial Studies): German independent research institute affiliated to the Goethe University Frankfurt, which conducts applied research in the areas of financial markets, financial intermediaries and macroeconomics.
- COSAC (French: Conférence des organes spécialisés dans les affaires communautaires et européennes des parlements de l'Union européenne - Conference of Community and European Affairs Committees of Parliaments of the European Union): conference of Members of the European Parliament and national Members of Parliament (MPs) drawn from parliamentary committees responsible for European Union affairs; mainly intended for personal contacts and exchange of information but also adopts proposals to EU institutions.
- CRAR: See CAR.

== D ==
- DSA (Debt sustainability analysis): IMF's analysis of a country's capacity to finance its policy objectives and service the ensuing debt without unduly large adjustments, conducted through a formal framework that became operational in 2002.
- DSGE modeling (Dynamic stochastic general-equilibrium modeling), also DGE: branch of applied general-equilibrium economic theory, influential in contemporary macroeconomics. It attempts to explain aggregate economic phenomena (growth, business cycles, effects of monetary and/or fiscal policy, etc.) on the basis of macroeconomic models derived from microeconomic principles. The European Central Bank (ECB) uses a DSGE model (the Smets-Wouters model) to analyze the economy of the Eurozone as a whole.

== E ==
- EBA (European Banking Authority): regulatory agency of the EU, established on 1 January 2011, whose activities include conducting stress tests on European banks to identify weaknesses in banks' capital structures. It is part of the European System of Financial Supervision (ESFS).
- EBF (European Banking Federation): organisation, currently numbering around five thousand members, representing the interests of European banks in the European Union.
- EBS: redundant acronym for Ireland's largest building society, rescued in 2010 from bankruptcy by the government's emergency injection of capital, amidst the Post-2008 Irish banking crisis.
- ECB (European Central Bank): the institution of the European Union (EU) that administers the monetary policy of the Eurozone member-states and the exclusive issuer of euro banknotes.
- ECJ (European Court of Justice): the highest court in the European Union (EU) in matters of European Union law.
- ECOFIN (Economic and Financial Affairs Council): configuration of the Council of the European Union, composed by the Economics and Finance Ministers of all European Union member-states.
- ECON (Committee on Economic and Monetary Affairs): committee of the European Parliament, overseeing the actions of the European Central Bank (ECB).
- EEA (European Economic Area): the geographical free-trade area, established in 1994, that comprises the European Union and EFTA, except for Switzerland.
- EFC 1. European Fiscal Compact (also Fiscal Stability Treaty, or FST): treaty signed on 2 March 2012 by all member-states of the European Union (EU), except for the Czech Republic and the United Kingdom, by which all parties agree to introduce a national requirement to have national budgets that are in balance or in surplus. 2. Economic and Financial Committee: committee of senior representatives of member-states' finance ministries and central banks, plus representatives of the European Central Bank (ECB) and the European Commission. EFC prepares the work of the Economic and Financial Affairs Council (ECOFIN), in particular regarding deficits and issues related to the euro.
- EFSF (European Financial Stability Facility): special purpose vehicle financed by members of the Eurozone to address the Euro area crisis.
- EFSM (European Financial Stabilisation Mechanism): emergency funding programme reliant upon funds raised on the financial markets and guaranteed by the European Commission using the budget of the European Union as collateral.
- EFTA (European Free Trade Association): an association, established in 1960, of originally seven (Greek: εφτά, eftá: seven) and currently four European countries (Liechtenstein, Iceland, Norway, and Switzerland), which operates in parallel and is linked to the European Union (EU).
- EIOPA (European Insurance and Occupational Pensions Authority): financial regulatory institution of the European Union, whose core responsibilities are the support of the stability of the financial system, the maintenance of transparency in the financial markets and products, as well as the protection of insurance policyholders, pension scheme members and beneficiaries. It is part of the European System of Financial Supervisors (ESFS).
- ELA (Emergency Liquidity Assistance): injections of liquidity to European private and central banks by the European Central Bank (ECB).
- EMU (Economic and Monetary Union; synonymous to Eurozone): umbrella term for the group of policies aimed at converging the economies of European Union members so as to allow them to adopt a single currency, the euro.
- Eonia (Euro OverNight Index Average): an effective overnight interest rate computed as the weighted average of all overnight unsecured lending transactions in the interbank market and calculated by the European Central Bank (ECB). (See also Euribor; see U.S. Federal Reserve overnight interest rate).
- ERM (European Exchange Rate Mechanism): system introduced by the European Community in 1979, as part of the European Monetary System (EMS), aiming to reduce exchange rate volatility and achieve monetary stability in Europe, in preparation for the Economic and Monetary Union and the introduction of the euro.
- ESA or ESA95 (European system of national and regional accounts): the European system of collecting comparable, up-to-date and reliable information on the economy of the European Union's member states. It is broadly consistent with the System of National Accounts of the United Nations.
- ESCB (European System of Central Banks): comprises the European Central Bank (ECB) and the national central banks (NCBs) of all European Union (EU) member-states. The Eurosystem, and not ESCB, is the responsible authority on all issues concerning the European common currency (€).
- ESFS (European System of Financial Supervisors): the institutional architecture of the EU financial supervision, created in response to the 2008 financial crisis. It comprises the European Banking Authority (EBA), the European Insurance and Occupational Pensions Authority (EIOPA), and the European Securities and Markets Authority (ESMA).
- ESM (European Stability Mechanism): international organisation located in Luxembourg, which provides financial assistance to Eurozone members in financial difficulty, replacing EFSF and EFSM, which will continue to handle transfer and monitoring of the previously approved bailout loans for Ireland, Portugal and Greece.
- ESMA (European Securities and Markets Authority): financial regulatory institution of the European Union, whose task is to improve the functioning of financial markets in Europe and strengthen investor protection. It is part of the European System of Financial Supervision (ESFS).
- ESRB (European Systemic Risk Board) : agency tasked with the macro-prudential oversight of the financial system within the European Union. It is under the responsibility of the European Central Bank (ECB).
- EU (European Union): the economic and political union or confederation of 28 European member-states.
- Euribor (Euro Interbank Offered Rate): the daily reference rate based on the averaged interest rates at which Eurozone banks offer to lend unsecured funds to other banks in the Euro wholesale money market (or interbank market). Euribors are used as a reference rate for Euro-denominated instruments, just as LIBORs are commonly used for Sterling and US dollar-denominated instruments. (See also Eonia.)
- Eurodad (European Network on Debt and Development): network of European non-governmental organisations that research issues related to debt, development finance and poverty reduction.
- Eurogroup or Euro Group: Colloquial designation of the informal meeting of the Finance Ministers of the Eurozone, usually taking place the day before the formal meeting of ECOFIN.
- Eurogroup Working Group or Euroworking Group: preparatory body composed of representatives of the Eurozone member states of ECOFIN, the European Commission and the European Central Bank, which provides assistance to the Eurogroup and the Eurogroup's president in preparing ministers' discussions.
- Eurostat: the Directorate-General of the European Commission responsible for collecting statistical information from member states and providing them to the European Union, codified and summarised under the concept of the European Statistical System. It is also assigned the task of promoting the integration of statistical methods across member states, candidate European Union countries and EFTA countries.
- Eurosystem: the monetary authority of the Eurozone, consisting of the European Central Bank (ECB) and the central banks of the member states that belong to the Eurozone. The function of the Eurosystem is to apply the monetary policy decided by the ECB. See also ESCB.
- Eurozone: the monetary union of 19 European Union (EU) member states that have adopted the Euro (€) as their common currency and sole legal tender.

== F ==
- FATF (Financial Action Task Force on Money Laundering), also GAFI (Groupe d'Action Financière): intergovernmental organization founded in 1989 on the initiative of the G7 to develop policies to combat money laundering; intensified European money laundering investigations during the crisis.
- FDI (Foreign direct investment): investment by foreign nationals into a country; measure of attractiveness of country's economic conditions and prospects. Total FDI in Europe fell as a result of the Euro area crisis.
- FST (Fiscal Stability Treaty): see EFC, def. #1.

== G ==
- GAFI: See FATF.
- GDP (Gross domestic product): the market value of all goods and services produced within a country in a given period, usually one year. (See also GNP)
- GFC (Global financial crisis): term denoting the 2008 financial crisis.
- GNP (Gross National Product): the market value of all goods and services produced by the residents of a country in a given period, usually one year. (See also GDP)
- Grexit (Greek Euro Area exit): slang term introduced in 2012 in world business trading, referring to the possibility that Greece could leave the Eurozone, and possibly re-adopt its old currency, the drachma.

== I ==
- IFO (German: Institut für Wirtschaftsforschung - Institute for Economic Research): independent, influential German think tank, now part of the CESifo Group.
- IIF (Institute of International Finance ): global association of financial institutions created by banks of leading industrialised countries in response to the Latin American debt crisis, which has had a prominent role in the Euro area crisis.
- IIP: see NIIP
- IMF (International Monetary Fund): international organization, created in 1944, having as objective to stabilize exchange rates and assist in the reconstruction of the world's international payment system, whenever necessary.
- ISDA (International Swaps and Derivatives Association): trade organization of participants in the market for over-the-counter derivatives. Most credit default swaps (CDSs) use standard forms promulgated by ISDA, although some are tailored to meet specific needs. In March 2012, ISDA, by declaring that Greece had instigated a credit event, triggered payment on default insurance contracts.

== L ==
- LCDS: See CDS.
- LIBOR (London Inter-Bank Offered Rate): the average interest rate that leading banks in London charge when lending to other banks. It is widely used as a reference rate for many financial instruments, including sovereign loans. LIBORs are commonly used for Sterling and US dollar-denominated instruments, just as Euribors are used as a reference rate for Euro-denominated instruments. (See also Libor scandal.)
- LLR (Lender of last resort): term denoting an institution willing to extend credit when no one else will. In the Eurozone, the lender of last resort for banks is the European Central Bank (ECB).
- LTRO (Long-term refinancing operation): ECB programme of low-interest loans to European banks but not to European states, accepting loans from the portfolio of the banks as collateral.

== M ==
- MIP (Macroeconomic Imbalance Procedure): set of measures and policies, part of EU's sixpack legislation, designed to prevent and correct ostensibly risky macroeconomic developments, such as high current-account deficits, unsustainable external indebtedness and housing bubbles.
- Moneyval (Committee of Experts on the Evaluation of Anti-Money Laundering Measures and the Financing of Terrorism): institution within the Council of Europe and answerable directly to the Committee of Ministers, having the task of monitoring the status and implementation of anti-money laundering measures in Europe.

== N ==
- NAMA (National Asset Management Agency): institution created by the Government of Ireland, in late 2009, in response to the post-2008 Irish economic downturn and the deflation of the Irish property bubble. It functions as a bad bank, acquiring property development loans from Irish banks in return for government bonds, primarily with a view to improving the availability of credit in the Irish economy.
- NCB (National central bank): the institution that manages a nation's currency, money supply, and interest rates. The NCBs of Eurozone's member-states have ceded to the European Central Bank most rights for major central-bank operations.
- NIIP (Net international investment position); also, sometimes, NIP : the difference between a country's external financial assets and its external financial liabilities. A country's IIP (international investment position) is the financial statement setting out the value and composition of that country's external financial assets & liabilities.
- NPM (New public management): government policies that aim to modernise and render more effective the public sector. Part of IMF and ECB recommendations to Eurozone countries.
- NTMA (National Treasury Management Agency): government agency, established in 1990, which manages the assets and liabilities of the Government of Ireland, borrows for the exchequer, and manages the national debt.

== O ==
- OMT (Outright Monetary Transactions): ECB's purchases ("outright transactions") in sovereign-bond secondary markets, within the Eurosystem, and also, under certain conditions, of bonds issued by Eurozone member-states. OMT replaces the bank's Securities Markets Programme (SMP).
- OSI: See PSI.

== P ==
- PEPP (Pandemic Emergency Purchase Programme): the temporary asset-purchase programme of private and public sector securities initiated on 18 March 2020 by the ECB to counter the financial risks posed by the outbreak of COVID-19. The programme was terminated on 31 March 2022.
- PIGS (Portugal, Italy, Greece and Spain); also, since 2008, PIIGS (Portugal, Italy, Ireland, Greece and Spain): pejorative term denoting Eurozone's troubled economies.
- PSI (Private sector involvement): participation of private creditors in sovereign-debt restructuring deals. The participation of state sectors is denoted as OSI (official sector involvement).

== S ==
- SDR (Special drawing rights): supplementary foreign-exchange reserve assets maintained by the International Monetary Fund (IMF), which represent a claim to currency held by IMF member-countries for which they may be exchanged. An SDR functions as the unit of account for the IMF.
- SGP (Stability and Growth Pact): agreement among the member-states of the European Union, to facilitate and maintain the stability of the Economic and Monetary Union. In order for member-states to join the Eurozone, they would have to abide by the criteria for public finances which the Maastricht Treaty defined, such as member-states having (a) an annual budget deficit no greater than 3% of GDP, and (b) a national debt no greater than 60% of GDP.
- SMP: See OMT.
- SONIA (Sterling OverNight Index Average): reference rate for transactions in the British Sterling market, calculated as the weighted average rate of all unsecured overnight sterling transactions brokered in London by members of The Wholesale Markets Brokers' Association.
- SPE (Special purpose entity); also SPV (Special purpose vehicle): legal entity created to fulfill narrow, specific and/or temporary objectives. Usually a limited company of some type or a limited partnership.
- SPV : See SPE.
- SRM (Single Resolution Mechanism): decision process that applies to banks covered by the Single Supervisory Mechanism. SRM covers all banks established in the Eurozone.
- SSM (Single Supervisory Mechanism): synonym of European Banking Supervision.
- S&P (Standard & Poor's): American financial services company and one of the biggest credit-rating agencies in the world.

== T ==
- TARGET (Trans-European, Automated, Real-time, Gross Settlement, Express Transfer system): interbank payment system for the real-time processing of cross-border money transfers throughout the European Union.
- TARGET2: the 2nd generation of TARGET Services, in place from 2007 to 2023.
- TEU (Treaty on European Union), also known as the Maastricht Treaty: it created in 1992 the three-pillars structure of the EU and led to the creation of the single European currency.
- TSCG (Treaty on Stability, Coordination and Governance in the Economic and Monetary Union). Same as the FST (Fiscal Stability Treaty).

== See also ==
- List of people associated with the eurozone crisis
