= Overnight indexed swap =

Interest rate swaps for overnight loans

An overnight indexed swap (OIS) is an interest rate swap (IRS) over some given term, e.g. 10Y, where the periodic fixed payments are tied to a given fixed rate while the periodic floating payments are tied to a floating rate calculated from a daily compounded overnight rate over the floating coupon period. The OIS term is not overnight; it is the underlying reference rate that is an overnight rate. The exact compounding formula depends on the type of such overnight rate.

The index rate is typically the rate for overnight lending between banks, either non-secured or secured, for example the Federal funds rate or SOFR for US dollar, €STR (formerly EONIA) for Euro or SONIA for sterling. The fixed rate of OIS is typically an interest rate considered less risky than the corresponding interbank rate (LIBOR) because there is limited counterparty risk.

== LIBOR–OIS spread ==
The LIBOR–OIS spread is the difference between IRS rates, based on the LIBOR, and OIS rates, based on overnight rates, for the same term. The spread between the two rates is considered to be a measure of health of the banking system. It is an important measure of risk and liquidity in the money market, considered by many, including former US Federal Reserve chairman Alan Greenspan, to be a strong indicator for the relative stress in the money markets.

A higher spread (high Libor) is typically interpreted as indication of a decreased willingness to lend by major banks, while a lower spread indicates higher liquidity in the market. As such, the spread can be viewed as indication of banks' perception of the creditworthiness of other financial institutions and the general availability of funds for lending purposes.

The LIBOR–OIS spread has historically hovered around 10 basis points (bps). However, during the 2008 financial crisis, the spread spiked to an all-time high of 364 basis points in October 2008, indicating a severe credit crunch. Since that time the spread has declined erratically but substantially, dropping below 100 basis points in mid-January 2009 and returning to 10–15 basis points by September 2009.

== Risk barometer ==
3-month LIBOR is generally a floating rate of financing, which fluctuates depending on how risky a lending bank feels about a borrowing bank. The OIS is a swap derived from the overnight rate, which is generally fixed by the local central bank. The OIS allows LIBOR-based banks to borrow at a fixed rate of interest over the same period. In the United States, the spread is based on the LIBOR Eurodollar rate and the Federal Reserve's Fed Funds rate.

LIBOR is risky in the sense that the lending bank loans cash to the borrowing bank, and the OIS is stable in the sense that both counterparties only swap the floating rate of interest for the fixed rate of interest. The spread between the two is, therefore, a measure of how likely borrowing banks will default. This reflects counterparty credit risk premiums in contrast to liquidity risk premiums. However, given the mismatch in the tenor of the funding, it also reflects worries about liquidity risk as well.

== Historical levels ==
In the United States, the LIBOR–OIS spread generally maintains around 10 bps. This changed abruptly, as the spread jumped to a rate of around 50 bps in early August 2007 as the financial markets began to price in a higher risk environment. Within months, the Bank of England was forced to rescue Northern Rock from failure. The spread continued to maintain historically high levels as the crisis continued to unfold.

As markets improved, the spread fell and as of October 2009, stood at 10 bps once again, only to rise again as struggles of the PIIGS countries threatened European banks. The spread varied from 10 to 50 bps up through February 2018. As of March 2018, the spread again stands at 50+ bps level.

Whilst liquidity is provided in excess by monetary policy authorities the LIBOR-OIS is less of an indicator of stress.

== See also ==
- Multi-curve framework
- TED spread
