= TONAR =

Overnight rate of Japan

By jurisdiction
- Federal funds rate (US Federal Reserve overnight rate)
- SOFR (Secured Overnight Financing Rate; calculated by the New York Fed)
- SELIC (Brazilian Real OverNight index rate)
- €STR (Euro Short Term Rate)
- SONIA (Sterling OverNight Index Average)
- SARON (Swiss Average Rate OverNight)
- TONAR (Tokyo Overnight Average Rate - Japanese Uncollateralised Overnight Call Rate)
- LIBOR (London Interbank Offered Rate - quotes in USD in London money market)
- EURIBOR (Euro Interbank Offered Rate)
- SHIBOR (Shanghai Interbank Offered Rate)
- ZARONIA (South African Rand Overnight Index Average)

Tokyo Overnight Average Rate (TONA rate or TONAR) or Japanese Yen Uncollateralized Overnight Call Rate (Japanese: 無担保コールO/N物レート) is an unsecured interbank overnight interest rate and reference rate for Japanese yen. Mutan rate and TONA rate are the same things.

== History ==
Japanese yen uncollateralized overnight call market started in July 1985.

Since December 28, 2016, the Bank of Japan has recommended the TONA rate as the preferred Japanese yen risk-free reference rate.

TONA rate is recommended as a replacement for Japanese yen LIBOR, which was phased out at the end of 2021, and Euroyen TIBOR, which will be terminated at the end of 2024.

== Target rates ==
TONA rate

Bank of Japan target rates
Dates	Target rates
1998.09 - 1999.02	0.25%
1999.02 - 2000.08	Initially 0.15%, then 0%.
2000.08 - 2001.02	0.25%
2001.02 - 2001.03	0.15%
2001.03 - 2006.03	None (0%)
2006.03 - 2006.07	0.00%
2006.07 - 2007.02	0.25%
2007.02 - 2008.10	0.50%
2008.11 - 2008.12	0.30%
2008.12 - 2010.10	0.10%
2010.10 - 2013.04	0.00% - 0.10%
2013.04 - 2024.03	None (0%)
2024.03 -	0.00% - 0.10%
2024.08 -	0.25%

== TONA Compounded Benchmarks ==
TONA Averages
TONA Averages are derived from the daily compounded TONA rate. The terms are 30day, 90days, and 180 days.
TONA Index
Assets when 100 was invested in TONA on June 14, 2017.
