= Euro money market =

Euro money market is the money market in the euro area that covers the eurozone short-term funds through loans that are typically less than 1 year. The euro money market products are short term deposits, repos, EONIA swaps and foreign exchange swaps.

== History ==
The euro money market develop out of the eurozone member states individual money markets after they adopted the Euro on the 1 January 1999. The European Central Bank sets the target rate for the eurozone which drives the overnight interest rate (Euribor) and interest rate swaps.

== See also ==
- Euro Interbank Offered Rate
- Eonia
- Euromoney
