= EURONIA =

Volume-weighted index average of Euro overnight rates in London

EURONIA is the volume-weighted index average of interest rates on unsecured overnight euro deposits arranged by eight money brokers in London. It is thus a UK-based equivalent of the better known EONIA, which uses data from trades originating in the Eurozone. EURONIA was introduced in January 1999 by the Wholesale Markets Brokers' Association (WMBA), which is also responsible for SONIA (the Sterling Overnight Index Average). Current values of the EURONIA along with other common world interest rate series are published daily by the Financial Times.

If the United Kingdom were to join the Eurozone, the Bank of England has discussed how SONIA would be replaced by EURONIA as a benchmark interest rate.

== See also ==
- EONIA
- SONIA
