= SARON =

Swiss average overnight bank loan rate

By jurisdiction
- Federal funds rate (US Federal Reserve overnight rate)
- SOFR (Secured Overnight Financing Rate; calculated by the New York Fed)
- SELIC (Brazilian Real OverNight index rate)
- €STR (Euro Short Term Rate)
- SONIA (Sterling OverNight Index Average)
- SARON (Swiss Average Rate OverNight)
- TONAR (Tokyo Overnight Average Rate - Japanese Uncollateralised Overnight Call Rate)
- LIBOR (London Interbank Offered Rate - quotes in USD in London money market)
- EURIBOR (Euro Interbank Offered Rate)
- SHIBOR (Shanghai Interbank Offered Rate)
- ZARONIA (South African Rand Overnight Index Average)

The Swiss Average Rate Overnight (SARON) is a measurement of the overnight interest rate of the secured funding market denominated in Swiss Franc (CHF). It is based on transactions and quotes posted in the Swiss repo market, and is administered by SIX.

Internationally, there is a consensus that financial benchmarks need to be resilient and reliable. Repo markets, in their role as the backbone of the financial industry and central bank activity, are the obvious choice. They are liquid, highly regulated, and stable. The National Working Group on the Swiss Franc reference rate, which leads efforts to reform benchmark interest rates, has recommended SARON as the alternative to CHF Libor.

In 2020, the SARON, along with the SAION (SARON Index), was endorsed under the EU Benchmarks Regulation and is registered with the European Securities and Markets Authority, which means that it can be used as an underlying for financial products sold in the EU.

== Introduction ==
Internationally, overnight interest rates play a significant role in determining the yield curve. Therefore, repo transactions have become a key pillar of the money markets - even the Swiss National Bank (SNB) uses repo transactions as a means of implementing its monetary policy. This instrument allows market participants to better manage their short-term refinancing needs, representing an important instrument for their daily liquidity management activities. Hence, through the Swiss Reference Rates, an additional instrument was created which provides an alternative to the Swiss Franc Libor.

The point of departure from Switzerland's yield curve is the SARON, an overnight reference rate based on data from the Swiss Franc repo market, which replaced the former Repo Overnight Index (SNB). The Swiss Reference Rates comprise a total of 32 benchmark rates that cover a term spectrum, ranging from overnight (ON) to 12 months (12M), plus two distinct indices for the ON term. The relevant calculations are based on CHF repo transactions concluded in the interbank market, as well as on indicative quotes posted on the SIX Repo AG trading platform.

== Attributes ==
=== Representative market ===
SARON is a reference rate reflecting both actual transactions and binding quotes of the underlying Swiss repo market. Its methodology ensures robustness and reliability. The market is under the surveillance of SIX Exchange Regulation and is regulated under the Swiss Financial Market Infrastructure Act (FMIA) as a multilateral trading facility. Between 2017 and 2019 the average daily trade volume was around CHF 3.3 billion.

=== Risk-neutral reference rate ===
Based on data from the secured money market, SARON can be used for different financial market instruments, but is particularly suitable for secured loans due to the negligible counterparty and liquidity risks. As a risk neutral benchmark, SARON shows considerably lower volatility to changes in bank confidence levels and during turbulent phases compared to a reference rate based on the unsecured money market. For the use of interest rate swaps, this is an essential advantage. Major clearing houses offer to clear swaps based on SARON. Exchanges are now offering the ability to trade futures on SARON, as well.

=== Calculation and publication ===
SARON is based on concluded transactions and trade quotes posted on the SIX Repo trading platform, provided they lie within the parameters of the quote filter. The quote filter is parameterized in a way that limits the possibilities for manipulation. SARON is continually calculated in real time and published every 10 minutes. In addition, a fixing is conducted three times a day at 12pm, 4pm and 6pm. The 6pm fixing serves as a reference reading for derivative financial products.

=== Governance and regulation ===
In 2017, SIX established an Index Commission for Swiss Reference Rates that advises in all matters related to them. SIX is committed to the IOSCO Principles for Financial Benchmarks and SARON is approved under EU Benchmark Regulation. The administration of the Swiss Reference Rates is in compliance with the recommendations and requirements set forth in these regulations. This also ensures the international use of the SIX benchmarks for customers and financial service providers.

== Quick facts ==
SARON	Swiss Average Rate Overnight
ISIN	CH0049613687
Bloomberg / Refinitiv-Ticker	SSARON/SARON.S
Definition	Volume-weighted average interest rate
Calendar	CHF Currency Holiday Calendar
Fixing Time	12pm, 4pm, 6pm CET
Fixings	SRFXON1, SRFXON2, SRFXON3
Day-Count Convention	ACT/360
Futures	EUREX: FSO3, ICE Futures Europe: SA3
Clearing	CME Group, EUREX, LCH
Historical data since	30.06.1999
Introduction	25.08.2009
Publication start	Daily at 8.30am CET
Publication interval	Every 10 minutes

== History ==
- SARON was introduced on 25 August 2009 with historical data available since 30 June 1999
- The National Working Group proposed SARON as the alternative to the CHF Libor in October 2017
- SARON swap clearing has been available since 9 October 2017
- The SARON 6pm fixing replaced the TOIS fixing on 1 January 2018
- SARON futures have been available for trading since 29 October 2018
- SARON Compound Rates for 1, 3 and 6 months have been introduced on 25 March 2020
- Further SARON Compound Rates (1 week, 2, 9 and 12 months) and SARON Compound Indices for all available SARON Compound Rate tenors have been introduced in March 2021

== Future ==
=== Compound rates ===
SIX as the Benchmark Administrator of the SARON offers SARON Compound Rates and SARON Compound Indices for pre-defined time periods.

The SARON is an Overnight Rate and applies for the upcoming overnight period. Market participants are engaged typically in longer-term contracts like 1, 3 or 6 months as a basis for loans and mortgages, deposits, bonds and floating rate notes, swaps and futures. To cover longer-term contracts in Swiss francs and to determine the respective observation period, SARON Compound Rates and Indices are provided. The SARON Compound Rates are standardised compounded rates and calculated by compounding the daily SARON rates. The SARON Compound Indices measure the daily change of SARON Compound Rates and are expressed in index points.

The Index Commission Swiss Reference Rates is advising on the concept and SIX is in close cooperation with the National Working Group (NWG) for References Rates.
