= Romanian Interbank Bid Rate =

Romanian Interbank Bid Rate (ROBID) is the average interest rate of interbank deposits. This is the rate at which banks offer to lend unsecured funds to other banks in the Romanian wholesale money market (or interbank market). It is similar to the widely used LIBOR (London Interbank Offered Rate), and Euribor (Euro Interbank Offered Rate). The rate quoted by each Participant in the Fixing represents the rate at which the RON deposits are offered to the other Participant for 15 minutes from the publication of ROBID and ROBOR rates by the Proxy.
