= Overnight =

Overnight may refer to:

== Film and broadcast media ==
- Overnight (1985 film), a Canadian comedy film
- Overnight (2003 film), 2003 documentary film
- CBC Radio Overnight, a Canadian radio program
- NBC News Overnight, an American late night newscast from the early 1980s
- The Overnight, 2015 film
- Overnights (radio show), an Australian overnight radio program broadcast on ABC Local Radio

== Music ==
- Overnight, 2016 EP by Jake Miller
  - "Overnight", single and title track of Overnight EP by Jake Miller
- "Overnight", 1958 single by Jim Reeves
- "Overnight" (Bee Gees song), 1987
- "Overnight", 1964 single by Margie Bowes
- "Overnight", 1981 single by Mike Holoway
- "Overnight" (Parcels song), 2017
- "Overnight", 2019 song by Maggie Rogers from Heard It in a Past Life
- Overnight (album)

== Other ==
- 'Overnight', informal term for the overnight rate interest rate, which large banks use to borrow and lend from one another on the overnight market

== See also ==
- Over (disambiguation)
- Night (disambiguation)
