= Official cash rate =

Rate of interest on overnight loans

The official cash rate (OCR) is the term used in Australia and New Zealand for the bank rate and is the rate of interest which the central bank charges on overnight loans between commercial banks. This allows the Reserve Bank of Australia and the Reserve Bank of New Zealand to adjust the interest rates that apply in each country's economy. The OCR cannot be changed by transactions between financial institutions as this does not change the supply of money, only its location. Only transfers between the central bank and an institution can affect the OCR.

As banks settle all inter-bank transfers overnight, the central bank can regulate the rate paid for cash by the sale or buy back of bonds and other government issued securities (these are known as domestic market operations). As the sale or purchase of bonds affects the supply of money, then the interest rate will change to reflect its availability. This system indirectly influences the term structure of interest rates in the whole economy. Changes to the official cash rate generally affect the rates on housing and other loans within a matter of days or weeks. Under the Australian system the Reserve Bank of Australia issues its dealing intentions at the start of each day, and banks and other financial institutions will act prior to the actual rate being achieved.

The rate is set by the central banks regularly, usually every month in Australia and every six weeks in New Zealand and forms one of the main tools to manage monetary policy.

== Australia ==
In Australia, the Cash Rate Target is set by the Reserve Bank of Australia (RBA) to influence the Interbank Overnight Cash Rate (Cash Rate) on unsecured loans between banks. This rate serves as a near risk-free benchmark rate (RFR) for the Australian dollar and is commonly referred to as AONIA in financial markets.

The Cash Rate, which represents the weighted average interest rate on overnight unsecured loans in the domestic interbank market, is a key tool for the RBA's monetary policy. It is used to guide interest rates across the economy and serves as a reference rate for Australian dollar overnight indexed swaps (OIS) and the ASX 30-day interbank cash rate futures contract.

Additionally, the Reserve Bank publishes the Cash Rate Total Return Index (TRI), which acts as a public benchmark reflecting the performance of an investment earning the Cash Rate, with reinvested interest, offering a near risk-free rate of return.

=== RBA Board Meetings ===
The RBA Board meets eight times a year and, following each meeting, a media release is issued at 2:30 pm Sydney time (which is Australian Eastern Standard Time) announcing any changes to the Cash Rate Target, which take effect the next day. Since 2024, the Board has met over two days every month excluding January, April, July and October.

== New Zealand ==
In New Zealand, the official cash rate (OCR) is set by the Reserve Bank of New Zealand to meet the inflation target specified in the Policy Targets Agreement. The current agreement, signed in December 2008, defines price stability as annual increases in the Consumers Price Index (CPI) of between 1–3% on average over the medium term.

The OCR was introduced in March 1999 and was reviewed eight times a year up to 2015 by the Reserve Bank of New Zealand. Since 2016, the OCR is reviewed seven times a year. Monetary Policy Statements are issued with the OCR on four of those occasions. Unscheduled adjustments to the OCR may occur at other times in response to unexpected or sudden developments; to date this has occurred only twice, following the September 11 attacks and on March 16, 2020 during the COVID-19 pandemic.

=== What the OCR does ===
The OCR influences the price of borrowing money in New Zealand and provides the Reserve Bank with a means of influencing the level of economic activity and inflation. An OCR is a fairly conventional tool by international standards. In the past, the Reserve Bank used a variety of tools to influence inflation, including influencing the supply of money and signaling desired monetary conditions to the financial markets. Such mechanisms were more indirect, more difficult to understand, and less conventional.

A decreased cash rate could mean lower home loan rates for borrowers, but can also mean lower savings and term deposit rates for savers.

=== How the OCR works ===
Most registered banks hold settlement accounts at the Reserve Bank, which are used to settle obligations with each other at the end of the day. For example, if a customer makes out a cheque or makes an EFTPOS payment, the money is paid by their bank to the recipient's bank. Millions of such transactions are made every day. The bank pays interest on settlement account balances, and charges interest on overnight borrowing, at rates related to the OCR. These rates are reviewed from time to time, as is the OCR. The most crucial part of the system is the fact that the Reserve Bank sets no limit on the amount of cash it will borrow or lend at rates related to the OCR.

As a result, market interest rates are generally held around the Reserve Bank's OCR level. The practical result, over time, is that when market interest rates increase, people are inclined to spend less on goods and services. This is because their savings get a higher rate of interest and there is an incentive to save; and conversely, people with mortgages and other loans may experience higher interest payments.

When people save more or spend less, there is less pressure on prices to rise, and therefore inflation pressures tend to reduce. Although the OCR influences New Zealand's market interest rates, it is not the only factor doing so. Market interest rates—particularly for longer terms—are also affected by the interest rates prevailing offshore since New Zealand financial institutions are net borrowers in overseas financial markets. Movements in overseas rates can lead to changes in interest rates even if the OCR has not changed.

== See also ==
- Federal funds rate in the United States
- Official bank rate – in the United Kingdom set by the Bank of England
