= Euribor =

Euro interbank offered (interest) rate

Overview from 1999 until 2018 of the Euribor-12m (red), 3m (blue) and 1w (green) values

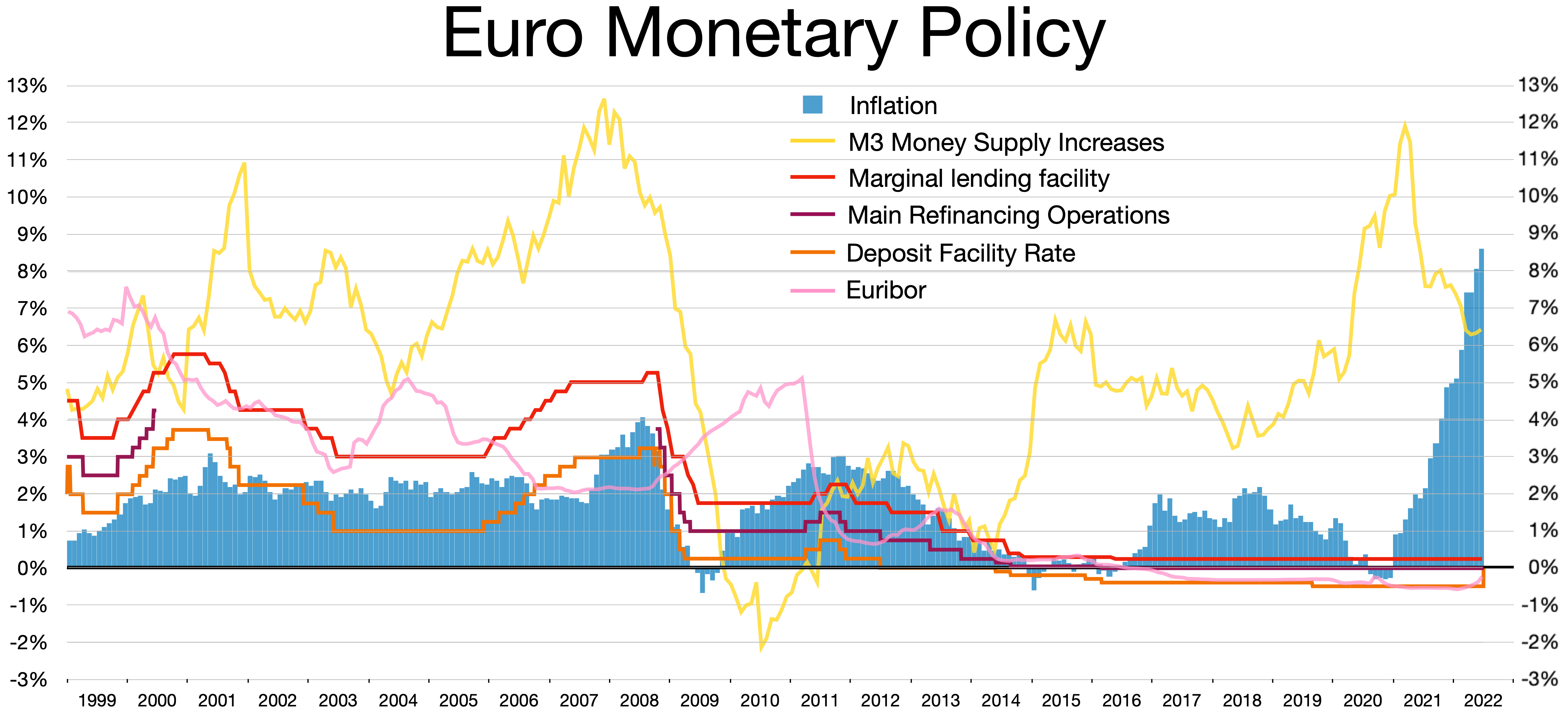
Euro monetary policy Euro Zone inflation year/year M3 money supply increases Marginal Lending Facility Main Refinancing Operations Deposit Facility Rate Euribor

The Euro Interbank Offered Rate (trademarked as Euribor) is a daily reference rate, published by the European Money Markets Institute, based on the averaged interest rates at which Eurozone banks borrow unsecured funds from counterparties in the euro wholesale money market (before only in the interbank market). Prior to 2015, the rate was published by the European Banking Federation.

Domestic reference rates, like Paris's PIBOR, Frankfurt's FIBOR, and Helsinki's Helibor merged into Euribor on EMU day on 1 January 1999.

Euribor should be distinguished from the less commonly used "Euro LIBOR" rates set in London by 16 major banks.

== Fallback ==
The EU Benchmark Regulation (Regulation (EU) 2016/1011) requires entities that use a benchmark to have robust plans in place to manage the possibility of a benchmark undergoing substantial changes or ceasing to exist. Where feasible and appropriate, such plans should nominate one or more fallback rates.

To facilitate the drafting of such plans for entities using Euribor® rates, the European Money Markets Institute has developed Efterm, a forward-looking fallback rate based on available market data related to Dealer-to-Dealer and Dealer-to-Client OIS Swaps and futures that reference the European Central Bank's Euro Short-Term Rate (€STR).

== Panel banks ==
=== Current banks ===
Country	Banks
Austria	Raiffeisen Bank International
Belgium	Belfius
Finland	OP Corporate Bank
France	BNP Paribas
France	Crédit Agricole
France	HSBC Continental Europe
France	Natixis
France	Société Générale
Germany	Deutsche Bank
Germany	DZ Bank
Greece	National Bank of Greece
Italy	Intesa Sanpaolo
Italy	UniCredit
Luxembourg	Banque et Caisse d'Épargne de l'État
Netherlands	ING Bank
Portugal	Caixa Geral de Depósitos (CGD)
Spain	Banco Bilbao Vizcaya Argentaria (BBVA)
Spain	Banco Santander
Spain	CECABANK
Spain	CaixaBank
UK	Barclays

=== Former banks ===
Country	Banks	Date of exit
Italy	Banco BPM	7 January 2019
UK	JP Morgan International - London	16 September 2016
Japan	The Bank of Tokyo Mitsubishi	1 July 2016
Finland	Pohjola Bank	13 May 2016
Finland	Nordea	18 December 2015
Denmark	Danske Bank	14 May 2015
Germany	Commerzbank	1 October 2014
France	La Banque Postale	11 April 2014
Belgium	KBC Bank	1 April 2014
France	Crédit Industriel et Commercial	31 March 2014
Italy	UBI Banca	10 March 2014
Ireland	Bank of Ireland	15 February 2014
Austria	Erste Group	11 October 2013
Germany	Norddeutsche Landesbank Girozentrale	29 June 2013
Ireland	Allied Irish Bank	29 June 2013
Germany	Landesbank Hessen-Thüringen Girozentrale	1 June 2013
Germany	Landesbank Baden-Württemberg	1 June 2013
Germany	LandesBank Berlin	1 May 2013
Germany	UBS	28 March 2013
Sweden	Handelsbanken	20 March 2013
Netherlands	Rabobank	3 January 2013
Germany	BayernLB	1 January 2013
Germany	Deka Bank	30 November 2012
USA	Citibank	21 September 2012

== Euribor-based derivatives ==
=== Euribor futures ===
EUR Euribor futures are traded on Intercontinental Exchange (ICE) and on Eurex.

They were previously also traded on CurveGlobal, part of the London Stock Exchange Group, which has closed down operations in January 2022.

=== Interest rate swaps ===
Interest rate swaps based on Euribor rates currently trade in money markets for maturities up to 50 years. A "five-year Euribor" will be in fact referring to the 5-year swap rate vs 6-month Euribor. "Euribor + x basis points", when talking about a bond, will mean that the bond's cash flows have to be discounted on the swaps' zero-coupon yield curve shifted by x basis points in order to equal the bond's actual market price.

== €STR ==
The other widely used reference rate in the euro-zone is €STR, published by the European Central Bank.

== See also ==
- €STR
- EONIA
- Euro
- European Banking Federation
- Federal funds rate
- LIBOR
- TONAR
- Prime rate
- ROBID
- SARON
- SONIA
