= SONIA (interest rate) =

Sterling overnight reference interest rate

By jurisdiction
- Federal funds rate (US Federal Reserve overnight rate)
- SOFR (Secured Overnight Financing Rate; calculated by the New York Fed)
- SELIC (Brazilian Real OverNight index rate)
- €STR (Euro Short Term Rate)
- SONIA (Sterling OverNight Index Average)
- SARON (Swiss Average Rate OverNight)
- TONAR (Tokyo Overnight Average Rate - Japanese Uncollateralised Overnight Call Rate)
- LIBOR (London Interbank Offered Rate - quotes in USD in London money market)
- EURIBOR (Euro Interbank Offered Rate)
- SHIBOR (Shanghai Interbank Offered Rate)
- ZARONIA (South African Rand Overnight Index Average)

The Sterling Overnight Index Average (SONIA) is the principal risk-free interest rate benchmark for sterling markets, administered by the Bank of England and published each London business day at 09:00 UK time for the previous day’s transactions. Introduced in March 1997 and transferred to Bank of England administration in April 2016, SONIA was reformed with a transactions-based methodology effective 23 April 2018. It is calculated as the trimmed mean of eligible unsecured overnight sterling deposit rates, based on the central 50% of the volume-weighted distribution, and is accompanied by the SONIA Compounded Index (from 3 August 2020) to support compounded-in-arrears conventions.

SONIA underpins a large share of sterling cash and derivatives markets and became the standard reference as the UK transitioned away from LIBOR, with regulators announcing on 1 October 2024 that remaining synthetic LIBOR settings had ceased.

== History ==
SONIA was launched in March 1997 by the Wholesale Markets Brokers’ Association as a measure of unsecured overnight sterling borrowing costs between financial institutions. Administration transferred to the Bank of England in April 2016, and a reformed methodology took effect on 23 April 2018. The Bank also began publishing the SONIA Compounded Index on 3 August 2020 to support compounded-in-arrears conventions.

From 2018, sterling cash and derivatives markets increasingly referenced SONIA. In July 2019 National Express signed what was reported as the first UK corporate loan referencing SONIA under a NatWest pilot scheme, signalling early adoption in the loan market.

== Methodology and governance ==
=== Calculation and eligibility ===
SONIA measures the rate paid on eligible sterling overnight unsecured deposit transactions. It is calculated each London business day as the trimmed mean of rates from the central 50% of the volume-weighted distribution, rounded to four decimal places. Eligible transactions are unsecured, have one business day maturity, settle the same day, are executed between 00:00 and 18:00 UK time, and are at least £25 million in size.

=== Publication and oversight ===
The Bank of England publishes SONIA at 09:00 on the following business day together with aggregate volume and selected percentile rates. The SONIA Compounded Index is published at the same time. Oversight is provided by a SONIA Oversight Committee supported by a Stakeholder Advisory Group. Republication occurs only if a new rate would differ by 2 basis points or more from the original figure. If data are insufficient or systems are disrupted, a contingency methodology that references Bank Rate plus a historical spread may be used and any such use is flagged to licensees. The Bank states that SONIA’s administration is compliant with IOSCO’s Principles for Financial Benchmarks and publishes supporting assurance material.

=== Compounded conventions in cash products ===
Market guidance for cash products recommends compounded in arrears SONIA with a five banking day lookback without observation shift, ACT/365F day count, and rounding to four decimal places. Standardised fallback language is also recommended.

=== Term SONIA reference rates ===
Forward-looking term SONIA reference rates are administered by ICE Benchmark Administration and FTSE Russell, with 1, 3, 6 and 12 month tenors. Methodologies use a waterfall of eligible inputs from SONIA-linked derivatives. FTSE publishes its term SONIA at about 11:50 UK time and applies integrated fallbacks if input thresholds are not met.

=== Statistical behaviour ===
Analyses by UK authorities indicate that the spread between SONIA and Bank Rate varies with liquidity conditions and market stress. During late 2022 the spread widened before compressing thereafter, which was consistent with changes in reserves and money market dynamics.

=== Worked example (compounded in arrears) ===
This illustrative five business day example uses ACT/365F and daily compounding. Suppose the observed SONIA rates are 5.10%, 5.09%, 5.12%, 5.11% and 5.115%. With one day per step the day fraction is $1/365$. Let $r_i$ be the day $i$ rate and $F$ the compounded factor. Then $F=\prod_{i=1}^{5}\left(1+r_i \times \frac{1}{365}\right)\approx 1.000700$

The period rate is $R=F-1\approx 0.000700 = 0.0700\%$.

For a principal of £100,000 the interest for the period is £70.00, rounded to the nearest penny.

An equivalent calculation can use the SONIA Compounded Index. If the index at the start is $I_0=100.000000$ and at the end is $I_5\approx 100.070000$, then $R=I_5/I_0-1\approx 0.000700 = 0.0700\%$.

== Market adoption and uses ==
SONIA is widely used as the reference for sterling overnight indexed swaps and for floating-rate debt issued in the UK and internationally. During the sterling transition away from LIBOR, authorities reported that compounded in arrears SONIA had become the market standard, with central counterparty conversions in December 2021 moving more than £13 trillion of cleared contracts from LIBOR to SONIA in a single process.

In the loans market, early transactions included the July 2019 National Express bilateral facility, which applied daily compounded SONIA with a reset lag. After transition, trading and risk transfer remained centred on SONIA-linked instruments, with industry materials and exchange documentation reporting continued growth in activity.

== Transition from LIBOR ==
The Working Group on Sterling Risk-Free Reference Rates coordinated industry transition away from LIBOR to SONIA and set priorities and timelines during 2020 to 2022. By 9 February 2022 regulators stated that compounded SONIA was fully embedded across sterling markets and that cleared sterling LIBOR derivatives had been effectively eliminated.

On 30 September 2024 the remaining synthetic sterling LIBOR settings were published for the last time, which marked the end of LIBOR publication. Sterling markets thereafter relied on SONIA, and where applicable term SONIA, for new and legacy contracts.

Standard documentation outlines approaches for compounding and fallback mechanics in risk-free rate derivatives. These frameworks supported the conversion of legacy contracts from LIBOR to SONIA.

== See also ==
- LIBOR
- Overnight indexed swap
- Risk-free interest rate
- SOFR
- €STR
- SARON
- TONA
- EONIA (historical)
