= Johannesburg Interbank Average Rate =

Overnight rate of South Africa

The Johannesburg Interbank Average Rate (JIBAR) is the money market rate, used in South Africa. It is calculated as the average interest rate at which banks buy and sell money. Since 2022, SARB has also published ZARONIA as the reference rand-denominated overnight rate.

JIBAR is calculated daily by the South African Futures Exchange as the average prime lending rate quoted independently by a number of different banks. The rate is available in one-month, three-month, six-month and twelve-month discount terms. In particular, the three-month JIBAR rate is used as a benchmark of short-term interest rate movements. The rate is calculated daily after all of the rates are received. It is calculated as a yield and then converted into a discounted rate. The JIBAR rate is available daily from Thomson Reuters.

ZARONIA reflects the interest rate at which rand-denominated overnight wholesale funds are obtained by commercial banks. It is based on actual transactions and calculated as a trimmed, volume-weighted mean of interest rates paid on eligible unsecured overnight deposits. The calculation excludes the highest and lowest 10% of interest rates to smooth out outliers. It is published on a T+1 basis reflecting the previous day's activity.

== See also ==
- LIBOR
- Prime rate
- TED spread
- LIBOR-OIS spread
