= Eonia =

Euro overnight interest average

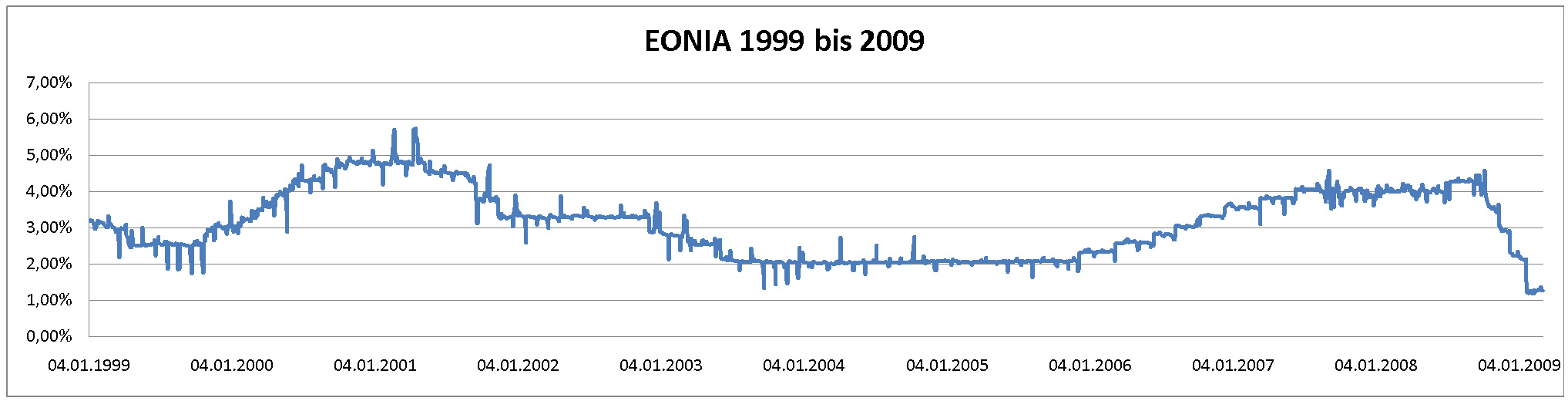
Course of EONIA 1999–2009

Eonia (Euro Overnight Index Average) was computed as a weighted average of all overnight unsecured lending transactions in the interbank market, undertaken in the European Union and European Free Trade Association (EFTA) countries by a Panel of banks (the same as for Euribor) subject to the Eonia Code of Conduct.

It was reported on an ACT/360 day count convention and displayed to three decimal places. "Overnight" means from one TARGET day (i.e. day on which the Trans-European Automated Real-time Gross Settlement Express Transfer system is open) to the next.

Eonia reference rates were calculated by the European Central Bank, based on all overnight interbank assets created before the close of RTGS systems at 6pm CET, and published through GRSS (Global Rate Set Systems) every day before 7pm CET. It can be found under the ISIN identifier EU0009659945.

EONIA was replaced by the Euro Short-Term Rate (€STR), published by the ECB since 2 October 2019.

== See also ==
- €STR
- EURONIA
- European Banking Federation
- Federal funds rate
- Interbank lending market
- TONAR
- SARON
- SONIA
- List of acronyms: European sovereign-debt crisis
