= Prime rate =

Interest rate at which banks lend to customers with good credit

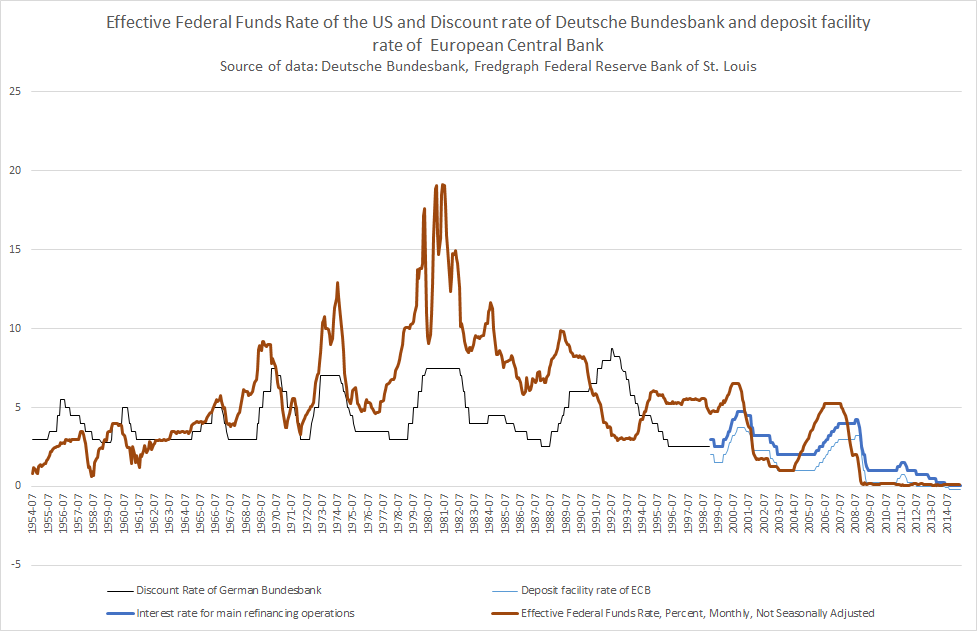
Prime rates in the US, FRG and the European Union until 2014

The prime rate or prime lending rate is an interest rate used by banks, typically representing the rate at which they lend to their most creditworthy customers. Some variable interest rates may be expressed as a percentage above or below prime rate.

The prime rate is used often as an index in calculating rate changes to adjustable-rate mortgages (ARM) and other variable rate short-term loans. It is used in the calculation of some private student loans. Many credit cards and home equity lines of credit with variable interest rates have their rate specified as the prime rate (index) plus a fixed value commonly called the spread or margin.

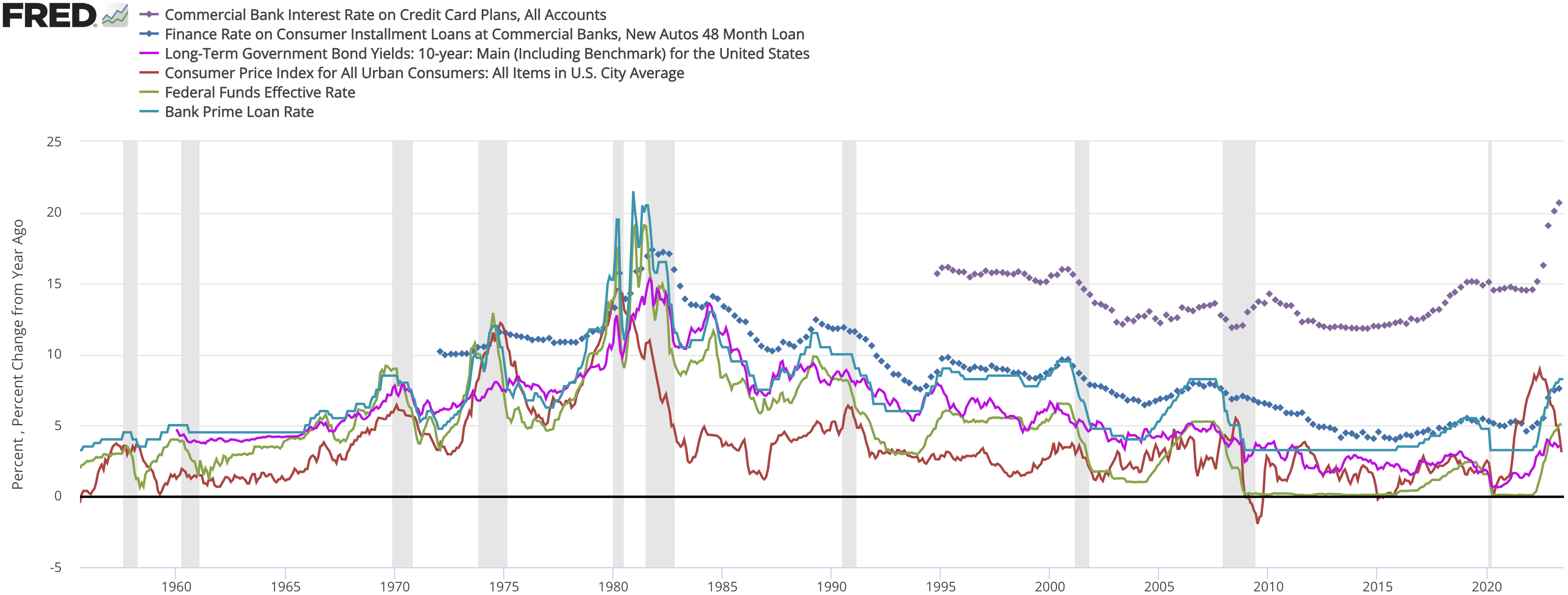
Prime Rate floats about 3% above the Federal funds rate Credit card interest rates Auto loan interest rate 48 months new autos Prime rate 10 year Treasury bond United States Consumer Price Index Federal funds rate

== Use in different banking systems ==
=== United States and Canada ===
Historically, in North American banking, the prime rate represented actual interest rate charged to borrowers, although this is no longer universally true. The prime rate varies little among banks and adjustments are generally made by banks at the same time, although this does not happen frequently. As of 23 June 2025, the prime rate was 7.50% in the United States and 4.95% in Canada.

In the United States, the prime rate runs approximately 300 basis points (or 3 percentage points) above the federal funds rate, which is the interest rate that banks charge each other for overnight loans made to fulfill reserve funding requirements. The federal funds rate plus a much smaller increment is frequently used for lending to the most creditworthy borrowers, as is LIBOR, the London Interbank Offered Rate. The Federal Open Market Committee (FOMC) meets eight times per year to set a target for the federal funds rate.

Prior to December 17, 2008, the Wall Street Journal followed a policy of changing its published prime rate when 23 out of 30 of the United States' largest banks changed their prime rates. Recognizing that fewer, larger banks now control most banking assets (that is, it is more concentrated), the Journal now publishes a rate reflecting the base rate posted by at least 70% of the top ten banks by assets.

=== Malaysia ===
Effective January 2, 2015, the Base Lending Rate (BLR) structure was replaced with a new Base Rate (BR) system. Under the BR system, which serves as the main reference rate for new retail floating rate loans, Malaysian banks can determine their interest rate based on a formula set by Bank Negara, Malaysia's central bank.

Malayan Banking Bhd (Maybank) has set a group-wide base rate at 3.2%, effective Jan 2, 2015. All new retail loans and financing such as mortgages, unit trust loans, share margin financing, personal financing and overdraft facilities which are applied for by individual customers will be based on the base rate. Though certain banks may be setting a higher BR compared to others, they can sometimes offer lower ELR to customers in order to remain competitive. Loans approved and extended before January 2, 2015 continue to follow the old BLR until the end of their loan tenure.

== List of countries ==
This is a list of countries by commercial bank prime lending rate, charged on new loans to their most credit-worthy customers. Each entry is denominated in the respective national currency. The list is sourced by Trading Economics and World Bank.

List of countries by commercial bank prime lending rate
Country	Commercial bank prime lending rate (%)	Date of information
Argentina	61.70	2024
Brazil	58.30	June 2025
Madagascar	53.60	2023
Zimbabwe	42.50	July 2025
Malawi	37.10	2024
Egypt	24.20	June 2025
DR Congo	23.30	2021
Uzbekistan	23.10	2024
Russia	21.75	June 2025
Mozambique	21.70	2024
Gambia	20.80	2023
Sierra Leone	20.40	2024
Ukraine	19.96	June 2025
Kyrgyzstan	19.80	2024
Angola	18.49	July 2025
Sao Tome and Principe	17.80	2023
Colombia	16.40	2024
Rwanda	16.00	2024
Honduras	16.00	2024
Mongolia	16.00	2021
Dominican Republic	15.30	2024
Kenya	15.28	June 2025
Suriname	14.80	2024
Myanmar	14.80	2020
South Sudan	14.70	2024
Azerbaijan	14.70	2024
Haiti	14.20	2023
Nigeria	14.00	2023
Armenia	13.10	2024
Tanzania	12.68	June 2025
Micronesia	12.60	2021
Paraguay	12.50	2021
Iceland	12.50	2024
Liberia	12.44	May 2025
Guatemala	12.40	2024
Georgia	12.00	2024
Jamaica	12.00	2024
Maldives	11.60	2024
Mexico	11.20	2024
Lesotho	11.20	2024
Burundi	11.20	2023
Namibia	11.00	2024
New Zealand	10.97	July 2025
Eswatini	10.90	2024
Bahamas	10.62	June 2025
East Timor	10.60	2024
Bhutan	10.50	2024
South Africa	10.50	July 2025
Australia	10.26	July 2025
Belarus	10.00	2024
Uruguay	9.90	2024
Bangladesh	9.90	2024
Seychelles	9.80	2024
India	9.77	July 2025
Zambia	9.50	2020
Albania	9.49	May 2025
Vietnam	9.30	2023
Nicaragua	9.10	July 2025
Mauritius	9.00	June 2025
Moldova	8.90	2024
Indonesia	8.80	2024
Romania	8.80	2024
Chile	8.71	July 2025
Pakistan	8.70	2021
United Kingdom	8.61	June 2025
Vanuatu	8.60	2024
Samoa	8.40	2024
Belize	8.40	2024
Guyana	8.40	2024
Papua New Guinea	8.30	2023
Jordan	8.17	June 2025
Bolivia	8.16	June 2025
Sri Lanka	8.10	July 2025
Algeria	8.00	2024
Comoros	8.00	2022
Cape Verde	7.80	2024
Tonga	7.80	2024
Trinidad and Tobago	7.50	2024
Hungary	7.50	June 2025
United States	7.50	July 2025
Costa Rica	7.30	2024
St. Vincent and the Grenadines	7.10	2024
Finland	6.96	June 2025
Grenada	6.90	2024
Panama	6.90	2022
Montenegro	6.60	2024
Antigua and Barbuda	6.50	2024
Saint Kitts and Nevis	6.50	2024
Thailand	6.35	July 2025
Saint Lucia	6.30	2024
Benin	6.30	2021
Burkina Faso	6.30	2021
Qatar	6.20	2024
Norway	6.10	2024
Botswana	6.01	May 2025
Macau	6.00	2024
North Macedonia	5.90	2024
Dominica	5.80	2024
Aruba	5.80	2023
Palestine	5.60	2021
Oman	5.50	2021
Brunei	5.50	2024
San Marino	5.50	2024
Latvia	5.41	June 2025
Singapore	5.30	2021
Hong Kong	5.25	July 2025
Estonia	5.20	June 2025
Solomon Islands	5.20	2021
Kuwait	5.06	June 2025
Canada	4.95	July 2025
Bahrain	4.94	June 2025
Malaysia	4.89	June 2025
Czech Republic	4.70	2024
Fiji	4.60	2024
Bulgaria	4.60	2024
Croatia	4.55	June 2025
Bosnia and Herzegovina	4.50	2024
Malta	4.47	June 2025
Greece	4.39	June 2025
China	4.35	August 2025
Italy	4.11	June 2025
South Korea	4.09	June 2025
Slovakia	4.06	June 2025
Austria	4.01	June 2025
Barbados	4.00	July 2025
Germany	4.00	June 2025
Portugal	3.73	June 2025
France	3.65	June 2025
Slovenia	3.53	June 2025
Belgium	3.52	June 2025
Luxembourg	3.45	June 2025
Taiwan	3.26	July 2025
Switzerland	3.00	2024
Israel	3.00	2022
Netherlands	2.47	June 2025
Japan	2.20	July 2025
Spain	2.18	June 2025
Denmark	1.75	July 2025
Peru	0.81	July 2025

== See also ==
- FRED (Federal Reserve Economic Data)
- Overnight rate
