= Bank rate =

Central bank's rate of interest

Bank rate, also known as discount rate in American English, and (familiarly) the base rate in European English, is the rate of interest which a central bank charges on its loans and advances to a commercial bank. The bank rate is known by a number of different terms depending on the country, and has changed over time in some countries as the mechanisms used to manage the rate have changed.

Whenever a bank has a shortage of funds, they can typically borrow from the central bank based on the monetary policy of the country. The borrowing is commonly done via repos: the repo rate is the rate at which the central bank lends short-term money to the banks against securities. It is more applicable when there is a liquidity crunch in the market. In contrast, the reverse repo rate is the rate at which banks can park surplus funds with the reserve bank, which is mostly done when there is surplus liquidity.

== Determining the rate ==
The interest rate that is charged by a country's central or federal bank on loans and advances controls the money supply in the economy and the banking sector. This is typically done on a quarterly basis to control inflation and to stabilize the country's exchange rates. A change in bank rates may trigger a ripple effect, as it impacts every sphere of a country's economy. For instance, stock market prices tend to react to unexpected interest rate changes. A change in bank rates affects customers as it influences prime interest rates for personal loans.

== By country ==
=== Australia ===
In Australia, the Reserve Bank of Australia sets the bank rate, known as the official cash rate. Until 2024, the board would meet eleven times per year to review and set the cash rate. In 2023, it was announced that the board would meet only eight times, excluding the months of April, July, and October from its meeting schedule. The RBA justified the change by stating longer and less frequent meetings would allow more time to examine issues and discuss changes in policy and strategy in better detail.

=== Brazil ===
In Brazil, the discount rate is called SELIC (Special System of Liquidation and Custody, translated). It is the mean term of the overnight rate, fixed by the Committee of Monetary Policy, a branch of the Central Bank of Brazil. There are some assets of the public debt whose interest rate is linked to the SELIC: an increase in this rate provides more profit for its owner.

=== Canada ===
In Canada, the bank rate is defined as the upper limit of the overnight rate band, announced, reviewed, and modified if necessary eight times each year (a schedule implemented in November 2000) by the Bank of Canada, (making it the target overnight rate + 0.25%).

Since September 2010, the Bank of Canada's key interest rate (overnight rate) was 0.5%. In mid 2017, inflation remained below the Bank's 2% target, mostly because of reductions in the cost of energy and automobiles; also, the economy was in a continuing growth spurt with a predicted GDP growth of 2.8% by year end. On 12 July 2017, the bank increased the key rate to 0.75%. In a statement, it confirmed that the rate would continue to be evaluated on the basis of inflation. "Future adjustments to the target for the overnight rate will be guided by incoming data as they inform the bank's inflation outlook, keeping in mind continued uncertainty and financial system vulnerabilities."

=== Eurozone ===
In the Eurozone, the bank rate is managed by the European Central Bank (ECB). The ECB assumed responsibility for monetary policy in the euro area in 1999, preceding the introduction of the euro currency. The ECB consists of three key decision-making bodies: the General Council, the executive board, and the Governing Council. The General Council serves as an advisory body, the executive board makes day-to-day decisions, and the Governing Council, composed of the executive board and eurozone national central bank governors, sets monetary policy for the euro area. The ECB's primary objective is to maintain price stability by controlling key interest rates to keep inflation at 2 percent over the medium term. It is also responsible for issuing euro banknotes, managing foreign currency reserves, and overseeing financial markets through increased banking union efforts.

The ECB also utilizes Standing Facilities, which are two facilities used to manage overnight liquidity. Qualifying counterparties can use the Standing Facilities to increase the amount of cash they have available for overnight settlements using the "Marginal Lending Facility". Conversely, excess funds can be deposited within the European Central Bank System and earn interest using the "Deposit facility".

=== India ===
In India, the Reserve Bank of India determines the bank rate, which is the standard rate at which it is prepared to buy or re-discount bills of exchange or other commercial bills eligible for purchase under the RBI Act 1934 (sec.49). The Reserve Bank of India also provides short-term loans to its clients (keeping collateral) at what is called the repo rate. This rate is revised periodically. However, there is no predetermined schedule. The repo rates are changed reactively depending on the economy. As in other countries, repo rates affect the money flow into the nation's economy and affect the inflation and commercial banks' lending or interest rate. As of May 2020, the Bank Rate is 4.65%.

=== New Zealand ===
In New Zealand, the Reserve Bank of New Zealand sets the New Zealand bank rate known as the official cash rate, which is reviewed by the Monetary Policy Committee seven times per year.

=== Singapore ===
In Singapore, the Monetary Authority of Singapore strategically reviews its Monetary Policy to promote price stability as a sound basis for sustainable economic growth.

=== South Africa ===
In South Africa the South African Reserve Bank determines the repurchase rate (repo rate) for short-term loans it grants private banks through its Monetary Policy Committee.

=== United Kingdom ===
In the United Kingdom, bank rates are set by the Bank of England's Monetary Policy Committee. The key interest rate is called the official bank rate, and is the lowest rate at which the Bank acts as lender of last resort to the money markets.

=== United States ===
In the United States, the discount rate is a bank rate set by the Federal Reserve Board of Governors for loans lent to commercial banks and other depository institutions through the Fed's discount window. This is not to be confused with the federal funds rate.

The Fed issues three discount rates based on credit type: primary, secondary, and seasonal. Primary credit is the Fed's main discount program, and is available to institutions in sound condition for up to 90 days with no restrictions on its use. Secondary credit is available to institutions that do not qualify for primary credit, but it is limited to short loan periods (usually overnight), has some restrictions on its use, and is issued at a higher interest rate. Seasonal credit is available to institutions with deposits of less than $5,000,000 that demonstrate a need for inter-yearly fluctuations in liquidity - often caused by construction, college, farming, resort, municipal financing and other seasonal types of business. Current discount rates are published on the Fed's Discount Window webpage.

== See also ==
- List of sovereign states by central bank interest rates
- Overnight rate
- Monetary policy
- Discount window
