= TED spread =

Difference between the interest rates on interbank loans

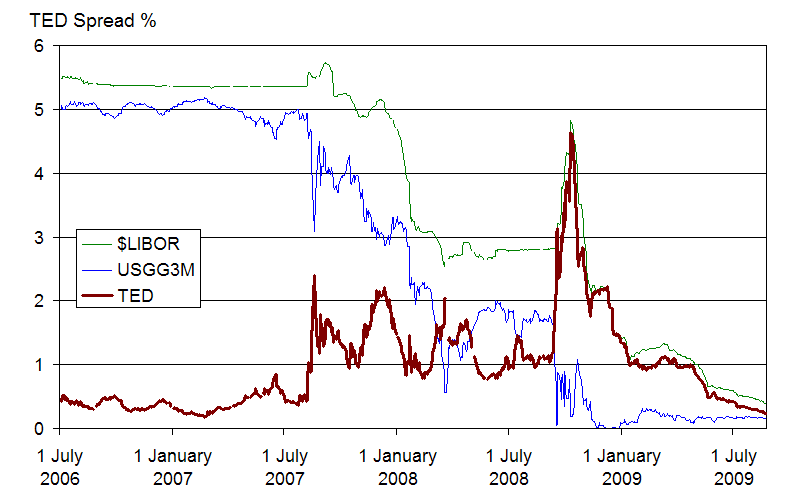
TED spread (in red) and components during the 2008 financial crisis

TED spread (in green), 1986 to 2015

The TED spread is the difference between the interest rates on interbank loans and on short-term U.S. government debt ("T-bills"). TED is an acronym formed from T-Bill and ED, the ticker symbol for the Eurodollar futures contract.

Initially, the TED spread was the difference between the interest rates for three-month U.S. Treasuries contracts and the three-month Eurodollars contract as represented by the London Interbank Offered Rate (LIBOR). However, since the Chicago Mercantile Exchange dropped T-bill futures after the 1987 crash, the TED spread was calculated as the difference between the three-month LIBOR and the three-month T-bill interest rate. The discontinuation of LIBOR in 2021 led to its partial replacement by the Secured Overnight Financing Rate (SOFR) in the calculation, which does not provide an equivalent measurement.

== Formula and reading ==
$$\mbox{TED spread} = {\mbox{3-month LIBOR rate} - \mbox{3-month T-bill interest rate}}$$
The size of the spread was usually denominated in basis points (bps). For example, if the T-bill rate is 5.10% and ED trades at 5.50%, the TED spread is 40 bps. The TED spread fluctuated over time but generally had remained within the range of 10 and 50 bps (0.1% and 0.5%) except in times of financial crisis. A rising TED spread often presaged a downturn in the U.S. stock market, as it indicated that liquidity was being withdrawn. The discontinuation of LIBOR and its replacement by SOFR provides a similar, but not equivalent replacement, as SOFR tracks secured lending and LIBOR tracked unsecured loans.

== Indicator of counterparty risk ==
The TED spread was an indicator of perceived credit risk in the general economy, since T-bills are considered risk-free while LIBOR reflected the credit risk of lending to commercial banks. An increase in the TED spread was a sign that lenders believe the risk of default on interbank loans (also known as counterparty risk) is increasing. Interbank lenders, therefore, demanded a higher rate of interest, or accept lower returns on safe investments such as T-bills. When the risk of bank defaults was considered to be decreasing, the TED spread decreased. Boudt, Paulus, and Rosenthal show that a TED spread above 48 basis points was indicative of economic crisis.

The utility of the TED spread declined even prior to the phaseout of LIBOR, as LIBOR was liable to impact from factors unrelated to market risk, such as changes in regulations on securities. In 2016, Goldman Sachs dropped the TED spread from its financial conditions index after an elevation in LIBOR rates was caused by Securities and Exchange Commission requirements for money market funds to move from a fixed $1 price per share to a floating net asset value.

== Historical levels ==
=== Highs ===
The long-term average of the TED spread had been 30 basis points with a maximum of 50 bps. During 2007, the subprime mortgage crisis ballooned the TED spread to a region of 150–200 bps. On September 17, 2008, the TED spread exceeded 300 bps, breaking the previous record set after the Black Monday crash of 1987. Some higher readings for the spread were due to inability to obtain accurate LIBOR rates in the absence of a liquid unsecured lending market. On October 10, 2008, the TED spread reached another new high of 457 basis points.

=== Lows ===
In October 2013, due to worries regarding a potential default on US debt, the 1-month TED went negative for the first time since tracking started.

== See also ==
- LIBOR-OIS spread
- Overnight indexed swap
- Treasury security
