= Overnight market =

Overnight money market

The overnight market is the component of the money market involving the shortest term loan. The overnight market is primarily used by banks and other financial institutions. Lenders agree to lend borrowers funds only "overnight", i.e., the borrower must repay the borrowed funds plus interest at the start of business the next day. Given the short period of the loan, the interest rate charged in the overnight market, known as the overnight rate is, generally speaking, the lowest rate at which banks lend money.

Most of the activity in the so-called overnight market in fact occurs in the morning immediately after the start of business for the day. Banks and financial institutions analyse their cash reserves on a daily basis, and assess whether they have an excess or a deficit of cash with respect to their needs. More specifically, deposit-taking financial institutions (such as banks) begin with forecasting the institution's and its clients' liquidity needs over the course of that day. If this projection is that the institutions' clients will need more money over the course of the day than the institution has on hand, the institution will borrow money on the market that day. On the other hand, if the analyst projects that the institution will have surplus money on hand beyond that needed by its clients that day, then it will lend money on the overnight market that day. In this context, the term "overnight" means that the cash borrowed is repaid the following day.

The bulk of trading occurs in the morning and is based on these projections. If, however, over the course of the day, the actual amount of money required by the institution's clients departs from that projected in the morning, it may become necessary for the institution to borrow money on the overnight market to meet this unexpected demand from its clients; conversely, if the institution finds itself with more funds on hand than it anticipated late in the day, it will then lend those funds on the overnight market.

The overnight rate fluctuates over the course of a business day, depending on the amount of money demanded from and supplied to the overnight market over the course of the day. The rate quoted as the "overnight rate" may be the rate at the end of the day, or an average of the rate over the course of the day.

Banks are the largest participant in the overnight market, although some other large financial institutions, e.g. mutual funds, also buy and sell on the overnight market as a way to manage unanticipated cash needs or as a temporary haven for money until the institution can decide on where to invest that money.

== See also ==
- Interbank lending market
