= PIGS (economics) =

Acronym for the economies of Portugal, Italy, Greece and Spain

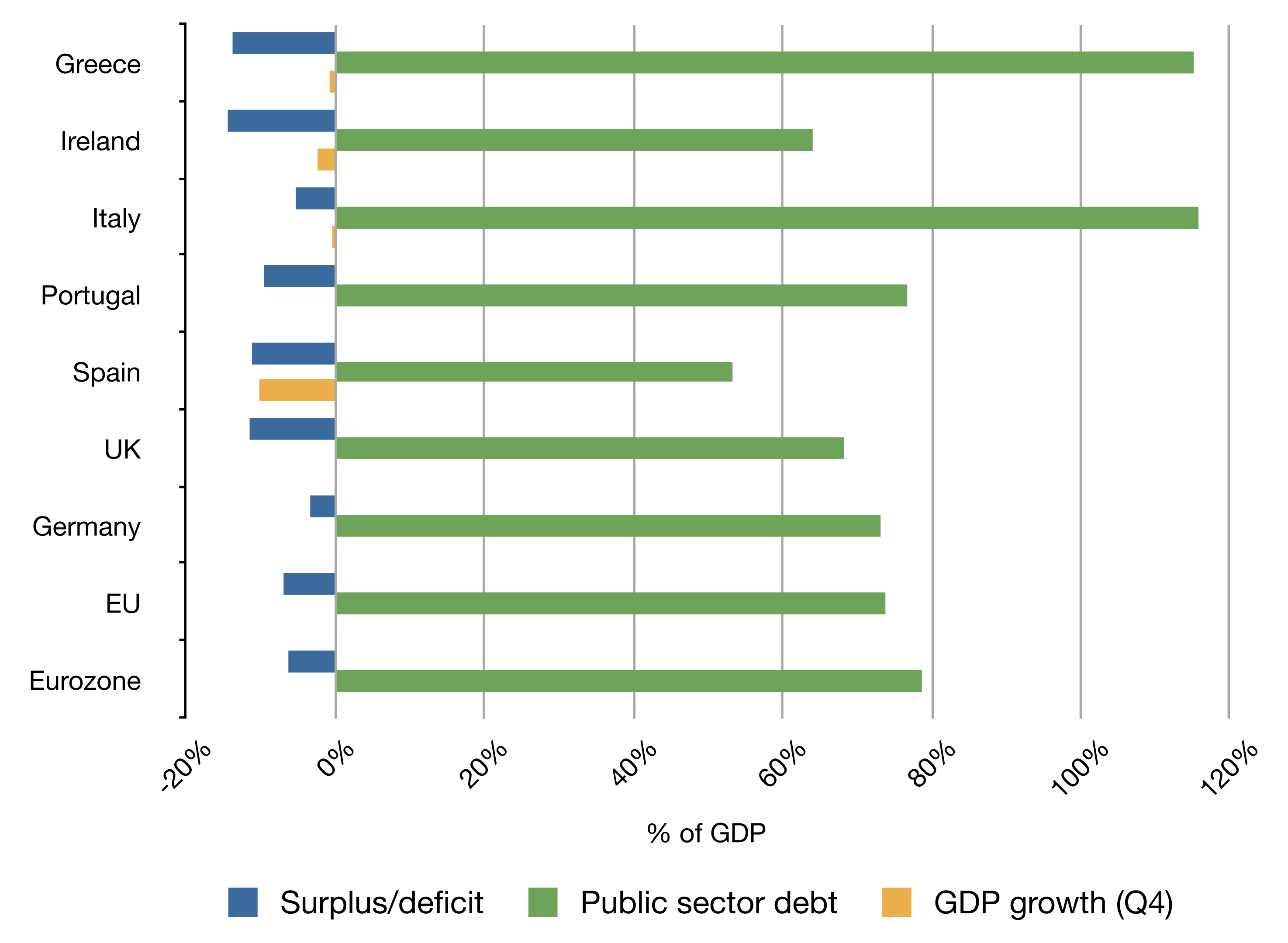
A graph showing the economic data from Greece, Ireland, Italy, Portugal, Spain, United Kingdom, Germany, the EU and the eurozone for 2009

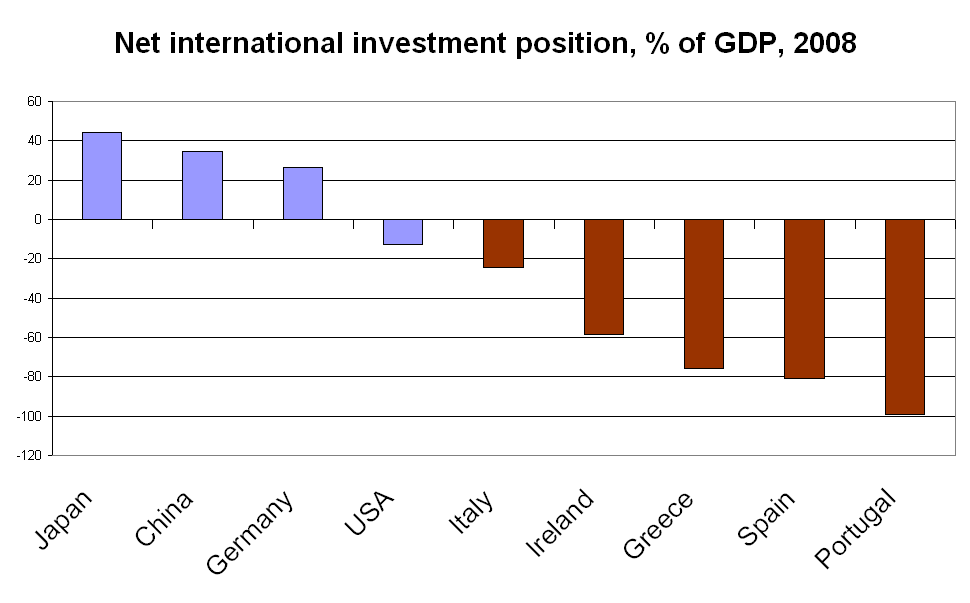
Net international investment position of PIIGS plus some other states

PIGS is a derogatory acronym that has been used to designate the economies of the Southern European countries of Portugal, Italy, Greece, and Spain. During the European debt crisis of 2009–14 the variant PIIGS, or GIPSI, was coined to include Ireland. At the time these five EU member states were struggling to refinance their government debt or to bail out over-indebted banks.

The term originated in the 1990s with the increased integration of the EU economies, and it was often used in reference to the growing debt and economic vulnerability of the Southern European EU countries. It was again popularised during the European sovereign-debt crisis of the late 2000s and expanded in use during this period. In the 1990s to late 2000s, Ireland was not included in this term; the country was still in the midst of its "Celtic Tiger" period, with debt significantly below the Eurozone average and a government surplus as late as 2006. However, taking on the guarantee of banks' debt, the Irish government budget deficit rose to 32% of GDP in 2010, which was the world's largest. Ireland then became associated with the term, replacing Italy or changing the acronym to PIIGS, with Italy also indicated as the second "I".

After the crisis started in 2008, Karim Abadir used the term GIPSI to reflect the sequencing he believed would take place. Sometimes, a second G (PIGGS or PIIGGS), for France or the United Kingdom, is added to the acronym.

These terms are widely considered derogatory and their use was curbed by the Financial Times and Barclays Capital in 2010. PIGS is considered a racist framing that was utilized to blame South European populations for the general economic crisis, thereby legitimizing austerity measures and sovereignty losses. GIPSI is an even more poignantly racist for its pun on the pejorative English term for the Romani people.

== See also ==
- List of country groupings
- Sick man of Europe
