= Shibor =

Reference rate in China

The Shanghai Interbank Offered Rate (Shibor; Chinese: 上海银行间同业拆放利率) is a daily reference rate based on the interest rates at which banks offer to lend unsecured funds to other banks in the Shanghai wholesale (or "interbank") money market. There are eight Shibor rates, with maturities ranging from overnight to a year. They are calculated from rates quoted by 18 banks, eliminating the four highest and the four lowest rates, and then averaging the remaining 10.

== See also ==
- Euribor
- Leverage (finance)
- Margin (finance)
