= Interbank foreign exchange market =

Market where banks exchange different currencies

The interbank market is the top-level foreign exchange market where banks exchange different currencies. The banks can either deal with one another directly, or through electronic brokering platforms. The Electronic Broking Services (EBS) and Thomson Reuters Dealing are the two competitors in the electronic brokering platform business and together connect over 1000 banks. The currencies of most developed countries have floating exchange rates. These currencies do not have fixed values but, rather, values that fluctuate relative to other currencies.

The interbank market is an important segment of the foreign exchange market. It is a wholesale market through which most currency transactions are channeled. It is mainly used for trading among bankers. The three main constituents of the interbank market are:

- the spot market
- the forward market
- SWIFT (Society for World-Wide Interbank Financial Telecommunications)

The interbank market is unregulated and decentralized. There is no specific location or exchange where these currency transactions take place. However, foreign currency options are regulated in a number of countries and trade on a number of different derivatives exchanges. In many countries the central bank publishes closing spot prices each trading day.

== Market makers ==
Unlike the stock market, the foreign currency exchange market (Forex) does not have a physical central exchange like the NYSE. Without a central exchange, currency exchange rates are made, or set, by market makers. Banks constantly quote a bid and an ask price based on anticipated currency movements taking place and thereby make the market. Major banks handle very large forex transactions, often in billions of units. These transactions cause the primary movement of currency prices in the short term.

Other factors contribute to currency exchange rates: these include forex transactions made by smaller banks, hedge funds, companies, forex brokers and traders. Companies are involved in forex transactions due to their need to pay for products and services supplied from other countries which use a different currency. Forex traders on the other hand use forex transaction, of a much smaller volume with comparison to banks, to benefit from anticipated currency movements by buying cheap and selling at a higher price or vice versa. This is done through forex brokers who act as a mediator between a pool of traders and also between themselves and banks.

Central banks also play a role in setting currency exchange rates by altering interest rates. By increasing interest rates they stimulate traders to buy their currency as it provides a high return on investment and this drives the value of the corresponding central bank's currency higher in comparison to other currencies.

== See also ==
- Interbank lending market
