= Federal funds rate =

Interest rates to maintain banks' balance

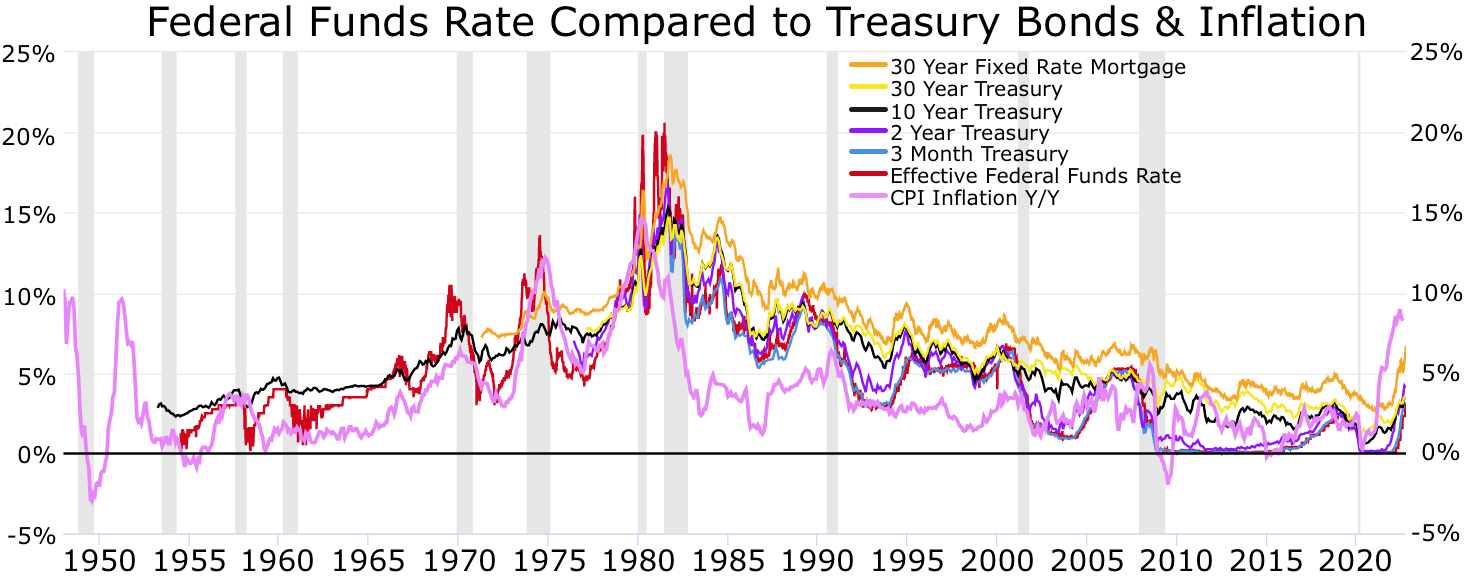
30 year mortgage average 30 Year Treasury Bond 10 Year Treasury Bond 2 Year Treasury Bond 3 month Treasury Bond Effective Federal Funds Rate CPI inflation year/year Recessions

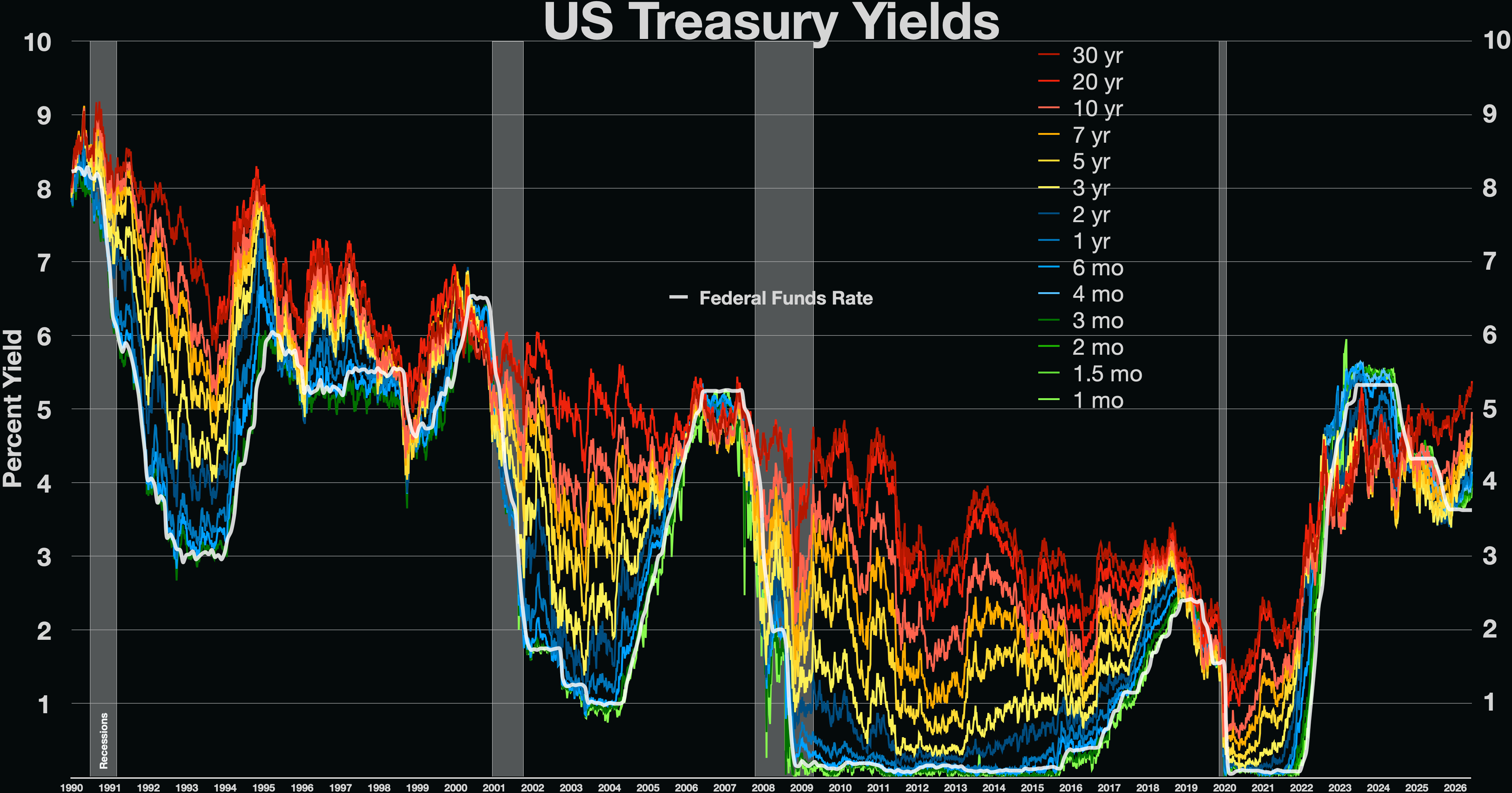
US Treasury interest rates compared to Federal Funds Rate. The Federal Funds Rate pushes up shorter term treasuries to cause an inverted yield curve when the Federal Reserve wants to tame demand and inflation.

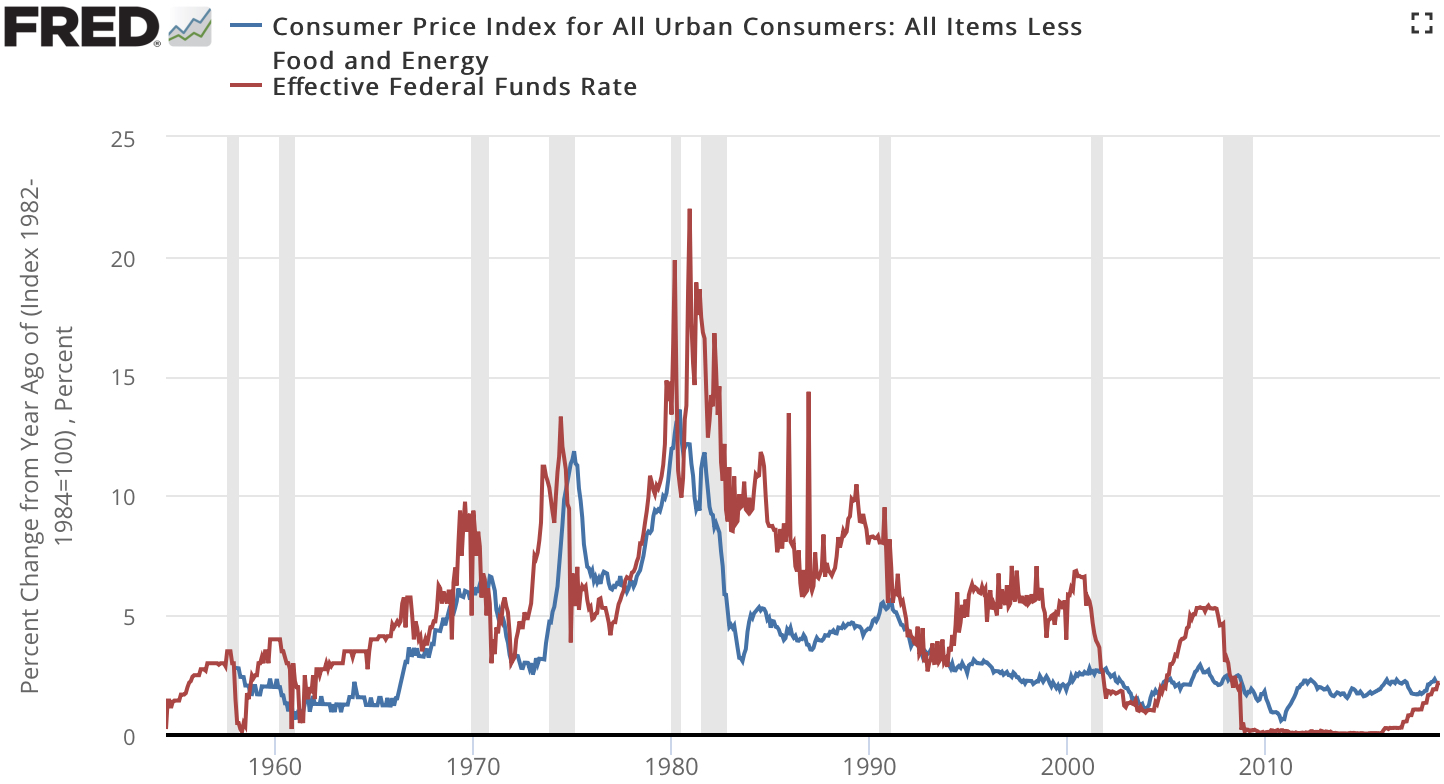
Inflation (blue) compared to federal funds rate (red)

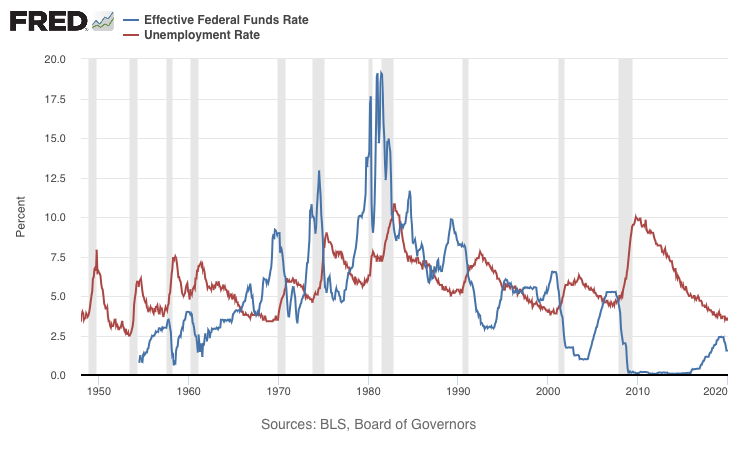
Federal funds rate vs unemployment rate

The federal funds rate is the interest rate at which depository institutions (banks and credit unions) lend reserve balances to other depository institutions overnight on an uncollateralized basis. Reserve balances are amounts held at the Federal Reserve. Institutions with surplus balances in their accounts lend those balances to institutions in need of larger balances. The federal funds rate is an important benchmark in financial markets and central to the conduct of monetary policy in the United States as it influences a wide range of market interest rates.

The effective federal funds rate (EFFR) is calculated as the effective median interest rate of overnight federal funds transactions during the previous business day. It is published daily by the Federal Reserve Bank of New York.

The federal funds target range is determined by a meeting of the members of the Federal Open Market Committee (FOMC) which normally occurs eight times a year about seven weeks apart. The committee may also hold additional meetings and implement target rate changes outside of its normal schedule.

The Federal Reserve adjusts its administratively set interest rates, mainly the interest on reserve balances (IORB), to bring the effective rate into the target range. Additional tools at the Fed's disposal are: the overnight reverse repurchase agreement facility, discount rate, and open market operations. The target range is chosen to influence market interest rates generally and in turn ultimately the level of activity, employment and inflation in the U.S. economy.

== Mechanism ==
Financial institutions are obligated by law to hold liquid assets that can be used to cover sustained net cash outflows. Among these assets are the deposits that the institutions maintain, directly or indirectly, with a Federal Reserve Bank. An institution that is below its desired level of liquidity can address this temporarily by borrowing from institutions that have Federal Reserve deposits in excess of their requirement. The interest rate that a borrowing bank pays to a lending bank to borrow the funds is negotiated between the two banks, and the weighted average of this rate across all such transactions is the effective federal funds rate.

The Federal Open Market Committee regularly sets a target range for the federal funds rate according to its policy goals and the economic conditions of the United States. It directs the Federal Reserve Banks to influence the rate toward that range with adjustments to their own deposit interest rates. Although this is commonly referred to as "setting interest rates," the effect is not immediate and depends on the banks' response to money market conditions.

On November 18, 2026, Federal Reserve Governor Christopher Waller said the Fed may need to take stronger steps to bring inflation down. He suggested a half-percentage-point rate increase in December or signaling that more increases could be coming in 2027.

Future contracts in the federal funds rate trade on the Chicago Board of Trade (CBOT), and the financial press refer to these contracts when estimating the probabilities of upcoming FOMC actions.

=== How the Fed attains its target rates ===
The Federal Reserve uses the interest rate paid on reserve balances (IORB) and overnight reverse repurchase agreements to help keep the federal funds rate within the FOMC's target range. Banks and other eligible institutions earn IORB on balances held at Federal Reserve Banks, which gives them little incentive to lend reserves to private counterparties below that rate. Overnight reverse repurchase agreement operations supplement this floor by offering an alternative overnight investment to eligible counterparties, including money market funds and government-sponsored enterprises, that generally cannot earn IORB.

Discount rate is the interest rate at which the Fed loans out its funds to eligible institutions via the discount window. This makes it unlikely for banks or other institutions to make loans at higher rates, therefore effectively setting a ceiling to the federal funds rate.

Open Market Operations are actions through which the Federal Reserve buys or sells government securities, thereby either adding or removing liquidity from the banking system. Without sufficient liquidity in the system, the other tools Fed uses become ineffective.

== Applications ==
Interbank borrowing is essentially a way for banks to quickly raise money. For example, a bank may want to finance a major industrial effort but may not have the time to wait for deposits or interest (on loan payments) to come in. In such cases the bank will quickly raise this amount from other banks at an interest rate equal to or higher than the Federal funds rate.

Raising the federal funds rate will dissuade banks from taking out such inter-bank loans, which in turn will make cash that much harder to procure. Conversely, dropping the interest rates will encourage banks to borrow money and therefore invest more freely. This interest rate is used as a regulatory tool to control how freely the U.S. economy operates.

By setting a higher discount rate the Federal Reserve discourages banks from requisitioning funds from Federal Reserve Banks, yet positions itself as a lender of last resort.

== Comparison with LIBOR ==
Though the London Interbank Offered Rate (LIBOR), the Secured Overnight Financing Rate (SOFR) and the federal funds rate are concerned with the same action, i.e. interbank loans, they are distinct from one another, as follows:

- The target federal funds rate is a target interest rate that is set by the FOMC for implementing U.S. monetary policies.
- The (effective) federal funds rate is achieved through open market operations at the Domestic Trading Desk at the Federal Reserve Bank of New York which deals primarily in domestic securities (U.S. Treasury and federal agencies' securities).
- LIBOR is based on a questionnaire where a selection of banks guess the rates at which they could borrow money from other banks.
- LIBOR may or may not be used to derive business terms. It is not fixed beforehand and is not meant to have macroeconomic ramifications.

== Predictions by the market ==
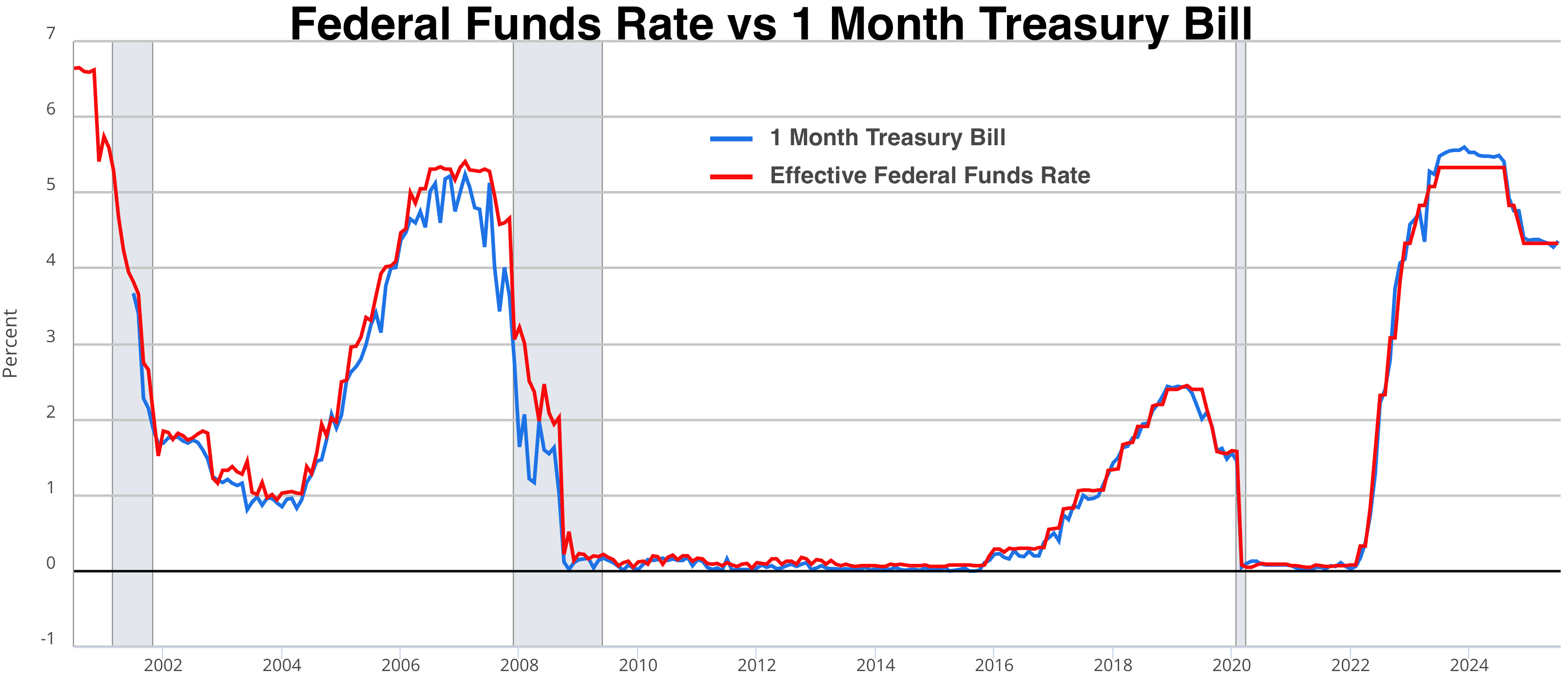
Federal Funds Rate vs 1 Month Treasury Bill

Considering the wide impact a change in the federal funds rate can have on the value of the dollar and the amount of lending going to new economic activity, the Federal Reserve is closely watched by the market. The prices of option contracts on fed funds futures (traded on the Chicago Board of Trade) can be used to infer the market's expectations of future Fed policy changes. Based on CME Group 30-Day Fed Fund futures prices, which have long been used to express the market's views on the likelihood of changes in U.S. monetary policy, the CME Group FedWatch tool allows market participants to view the probability of an upcoming Fed Rate hike.

== Historical rates ==
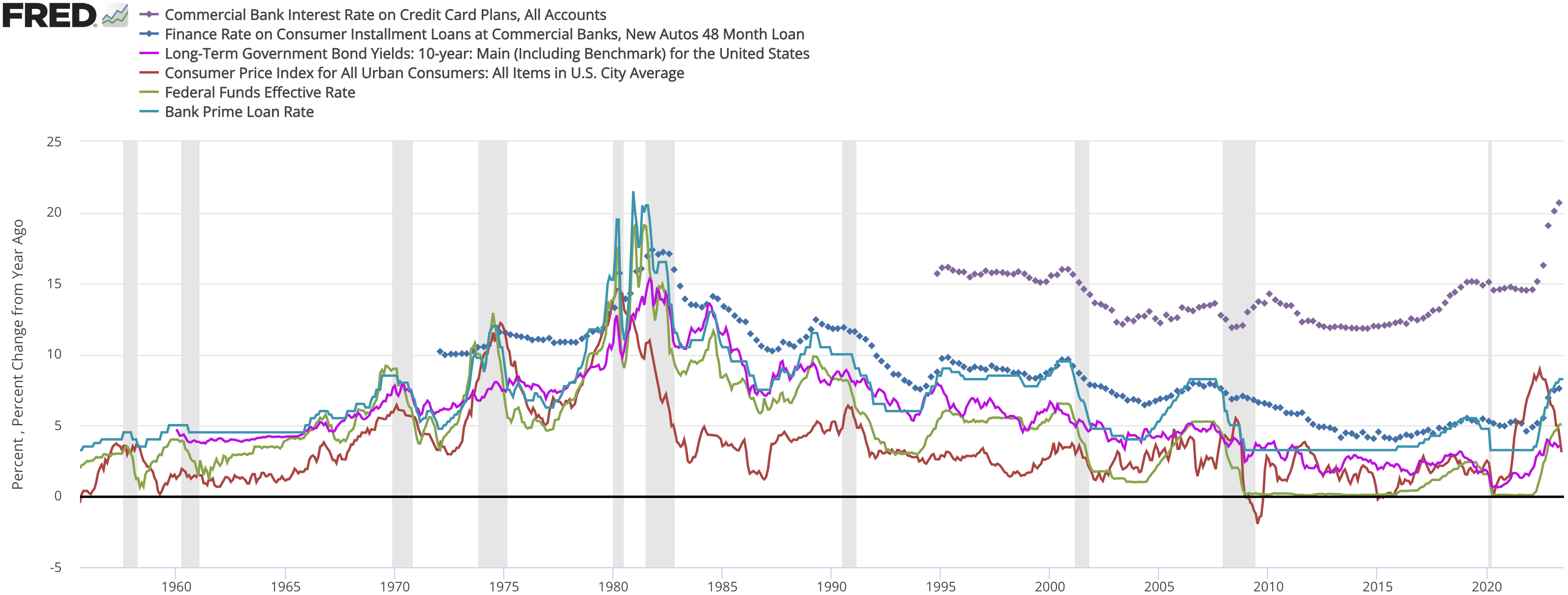
Prime Rate floats about 3% above the Federal funds rate Credit card interest rates Auto loan interest rate 48 months new autos Prime Rate 10 year Treasury bond United States Consumer Price Index Federal funds rate

The last cycle of rate increases occurred between January 2022 and July 2023 as rates steadily rose from 0-0.25% to 5.25-5.50%. The target rate remained at 5.25-5.50% for over a year, until the Federal Reserve began lowering rates in September 2024. The last cycle of easing monetary policy through the rate was conducted from September 2024 to December 2025 as the target rate fell from 5.25-5.50% to a range of 3.50–3.75%.

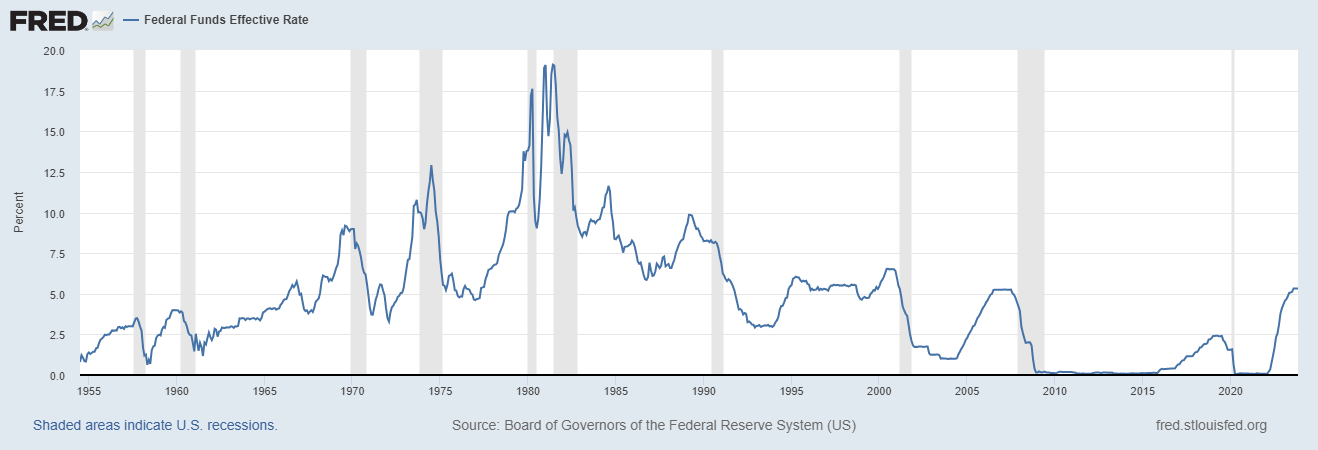

== Explanation of federal funds rate decisions ==
When the FOMC wishes to reduce interest rates they will increase the supply of money by buying government securities. When additional supply is added and everything else remains constant, the price of borrowed funds – the federal funds rate – falls. Conversely, when the Committee wishes to increase the federal funds rate, they will instruct the Desk Manager to sell government securities, thereby taking the money they earn on the proceeds of those sales out of circulation and reducing the money supply. When supply is taken away and everything else remains constant, the interest rate will normally rise.

The Federal Reserve has responded to a potential slow-down by lowering the target federal funds rate during recessions and other periods of lower growth. In fact, the committee's lowering has recently predated recessions, in order to stimulate the economy and cushion the fall. Reducing the federal funds rate makes money cheaper, allowing an influx of credit into the economy through all types of loans.

The charts referenced below show the relation between S&P 500 and interest rates.

- July 13, 1990 – Sept 4, 1992: 8.00–3.00% (Includes 1990–1991 recession)
- Feb 1, 1995 – Nov 17, 1998: 6.00–4.75
- May 16, 2000 – June 25, 2003: 6.50–1.00 (Includes 2001 recession)
- June 29, 2006 – Oct 29, 2008: 5.25–1.00

=== Rates since 2008 global economic downturn ===
- Dec 16, 2008: 0.0–0.25
- Dec 16, 2015: 0.25–0.50
- Dec 14, 2016: 0.50–0.75
- Mar 15, 2017: 0.75–1.00
- Jun 14, 2017: 1.00–1.25
- Dec 13, 2017: 1.25–1.50
- Mar 21, 2018: 1.50–1.75
- Jun 13, 2018: 1.75–2.00
- Sep 26, 2018: 2.00–2.25
- Dec 19, 2018: 2.25–2.50
- Jul 31, 2019: 2.00–2.25
- Sep 18, 2019: 1.75–2.00
- Oct 30, 2019: 1.50–1.75
- Mar 3, 2020: 1.00–1.25
- Mar 15, 2020: 0.00–0.25
- Mar 16, 2022: 0.25–0.50
- May 4, 2022: 0.75–1.00
- Jun 15, 2022: 1.50–1.75
- Jul 27, 2022: 2.25–2.50
- Sep 21, 2022: 3.00–3.25
- Nov 2, 2022: 3.75–4.00
- Dec 14, 2022: 4.25–4.50
- Feb 1, 2023: 4.50–4.75
- Mar 22, 2023: 4.75–5.00
- May 3, 2023: 5.00–5.25
- Jul 26, 2023: 5.25–5.50
- Sep 18, 2024: 4.75–5.00
- Nov 7, 2024: 4.50–4.75
- Dec 18, 2024: 4.25–4.50
- Sep 17, 2025: 4.00–4.25
- Oct 29, 2025: 3.75–4.00
- Dec 10, 2025: 3.50–3.75
- Sep 16, 2026: 3.75–4.00
- Oct 28, 2026: 3.75–4.00

== International effects ==
A low federal funds rate makes investments in developing countries such as China or Mexico more attractive. A high federal funds rate makes investments outside the United States less attractive. The long period of a very low federal funds rate from 2009 forward resulted in an increase in investment in developing countries. As the United States began to return to a higher rate in the end of 2015 investments in the United States became more attractive and the rate of investment in developing countries began to fall. The rate also affects the value of currency, a higher rate slowing the decrease of the U.S. dollar and decreasing the value of currencies such as the Mexican peso.

== See also ==
- Austrian Business Cycle Theory
- Bank rate
- Demand Management
- Eonia
- Equation of exchange
- Euro Interbank Offered Rate
- Federal Reserve Economic Data
- Inverted yield curve
- List of countries by central bank interest rates
- Modern Monetary Theory
- Monetary policy
- Mortgage industry of the United States
- Official cash rate
- Official bank rate
- Real interest rate
- SARON
- SONIA
- Taylor rule
- Zero interest rate policy
