= Overnight rate =

Interest rate of overnight loans between banks

The overnight rate is generally the interest rate that large banks use to borrow and lend from one another in the overnight market. In some countries (the United States, for example), the overnight rate may be the rate targeted by the central bank to influence monetary policy. In most countries, the central bank is also a participant on the overnight lending market, and will lend or borrow money to some group of banks.

There may be a published overnight rate that represents an average of the rates at which banks lend to each other; certain types of overnight operations may be limited to qualified banks. The precise name of the overnight rate will vary from country to country.

== Background ==
Throughout the course of a day, banks will transfer money to each other, to foreign banks, to large clients, and other counterparties on behalf of clients or on their own account. At the end of each working day, a bank may have a surplus or shortage of funds (or a shortage or excess reserves in fractional-reserve banking). Banks that have surplus funds or excess reserves may lend them (often at a multiple of their legal reserve ratio, if any) or deposit them with other banks, who borrow from them. The overnight rate is the amount paid to the bank lending the funds.

Banks will also choose to borrow or lend for longer periods of time, depending on their projected needs and opportunities to use money elsewhere.

Most central banks will announce the overnight rate once a month. In Canada, for example, the Bank of Canada sets a target bandwidth for the overnight rate each month of +/- 0.25% around its target overnight rate: the Bank of Canada does not interfere in the overnight market so long as the overnight rate stays within its target band, but the Bank will use its reserves to lend or borrow in the overnight market to ensure that the overnight rate stays within its announced bandwidth.

== Measure of liquidity ==
Overnight rates are a measure of the liquidity prevailing in the economy. In tight liquidity conditions, overnight rates shoot up. Overnight rates may also shoot up due to lack of confidence amongst banks, as was observed in the liquidity crunch of 2008.

In order to measure liquidity situation, the spread between risk-free rates and overnight rates is considered. The TED spread is a liquidity indicator for the U.S., which is the difference between LIBOR and Treasury bills.

== See also ==
- Bank rate
- Interbank lending market
- Overnight indexed swap
