= Money market =

Type of financial market providing short-term funds

The money market is a component of the economy that provides short-term funds. The money market deals in short-term loans, generally for a period of a year or less.

As short-term securities became a commodity, the money market became a component of the financial market for assets involved in short-term borrowing, lending, buying and selling with original maturities of one year or less. Trading in money markets is done over the counter and is wholesale.

There are several money market instruments in most Western countries, including treasury bills, commercial paper, banker's acceptances, deposits, certificates of deposit, bills of exchange, repurchase agreements, federal funds, and short-lived mortgage- and asset-backed securities. The instruments bear differing maturities, currencies, credit risks, and structures. A market can be described as a money market if it is composed of highly liquid, short-term assets. Money market funds typically invest in government securities, certificates of deposit, commercial paper of companies, and other highly liquid, low-risk securities.

Money markets, which provide liquidity for the global financial system including for capital markets, are part of the broader system of financial markets.

== Participants ==
The money market consists of financial institutions and dealers in money or credit who wish to either borrow or lend. Participants borrow and lend for short periods, typically up to twelve months. Money market trades in short-term financial instruments commonly called "paper". This contrasts with the capital market for longer-term funding, which is supplied by bonds and equity.

The heart of the money market revolves around the concept of interbank lending, where banks lend and borrow from each other using financial instruments such as commercial paper and repurchase agreements. These instruments are often valued with reference to the London Interbank Offered Rate (LIBOR) for the specific term and currency.

Finance companies usually secure their funding by issuing substantial amounts of asset-backed commercial paper (ABCP). This paper is backed by the commitment of valuable assets placed into an ABCP conduit. These assets can include things like auto loans, credit card receivables, residential or commercial mortgage loans, mortgage-backed securities, and other financial assets. Some large, financially stable corporations even issue their own commercial paper, while others prefer to have banks issue it on their behalf.

In the United States, federal, state and local governments all issue paper to meet funding needs. States and local governments issue municipal paper, while the U.S. Treasury issues Treasury bills to fund the U.S. public debt:

- Trading companies often purchase bankers' acceptances to tender for payment to overseas suppliers.
- Retail and institutional money market funds
- Banks
- Central banks
- Cash management programs
- Merchant banks

== Functions ==
Money markets serve five functions—to finance trade, finance industry, invest profitably, enhance commercial banks' self-sufficiency, and lubricate central bank policies.

=== Financing trade ===
The money market plays a crucial role in financing domestic and international trade. Commercial finance is made available to the traders through bills of exchange, which are discounted by the bill market. The acceptance houses and discount markets help in financing foreign trade.

=== Financing industry ===
The money market contributes to the growth of industries in two ways:

- They help industries secure short-term loans to meet their working capital requirements through the system of finance bills, commercial papers, etc.
- Industries generally need long-term loans, which are provided in the capital market. However, the capital market depends upon the nature of and the conditions in the money market. The short-term interest rates of the money market influence the long-term interest rates of the capital market. Thus, money market indirectly helps the industries through its link with and influence on long-term capital market.

=== Profitable investments ===
The money market enables commercial banks to use their excess reserves in profitable investments. The main objective of commercial banks is to earn income from its reserves as well as maintain liquidity to meet the uncertain cash demand of its depositors. In the money market, the excess reserves of commercial banks are invested in near money assets (e.g., short-term bills of exchange), which are easily converted into cash. Thus, commercial banks earn profits without sacrificing liquidity.

=== Self-sufficiency of commercial banks ===
Developed money markets help commercial banks to become self-sufficient. In an emergency, when commercial banks have scarcity of funds, they need not approach the central bank and borrow at a higher interest rate. They can instead meet their requirements by recalling their old short-run loans from the money market.

=== Help to Central Bank ===
Though the central bank can function and influence the banking system in the absence of a money market, the existence of a developed money market significantly enhances monetary policy transmission and central bank efficiency.

Money markets help central banks in three primary ways:

Interest Rate Signaling: Short-term interest rates in money markets serve as immediate indicators of monetary and banking conditions, guiding central bank policy decisions. As Chen & Valcarcel (2021) demonstrate, money market rates respond quickly to policy changes, providing real-time feedback on policy effectiveness. Bech & Klee (2011) further show how segmentation in money markets can affect this transmission mechanism.

Policy Implementation: Well-integrated money markets enable central banks to achieve widespread influence across financial sub-markets efficiently. When the central bank adjusts its policy rate, these changes transmit rapidly through interbank markets to other financial instruments and ultimately to the broader economy. Carpenter & Demiralp (2012) highlight how this transmission has evolved beyond traditional money multiplier frameworks.

Liquidity Management: Money markets facilitate efficient distribution of liquidity among financial institutions, reducing the need for direct central bank intervention. This market-based approach to liquidity allocation improves the overall efficiency of monetary policy operations. However, as Brunnermeier & Koby (2018) note, there are limits to the effectiveness of monetary policy through these channels, particularly in low-interest-rate environments.

== Instruments ==
- Certificate of deposit – Time deposit, commonly offered to consumers by banks, thrift institutions, and credit unions.
- Repurchase agreements – Short-term loans—normally for less than one week and frequently for one day—arranged by selling securities to an investor with an agreement to repurchase them at a fixed price on a fixed date.
- Money market mutual funds - short-term investment debt, operated by professional institutions. Money market mutual funds are an investment fund where a number of investors invest their money in mutual fund institutions, and they diversify the funds in various investments.
- Commercial paper – Short term instruments promissory notes issued by company at discount to face value and redeemed at face value
- Eurodollar deposit – Deposits made in U.S. dollars at a bank or bank branch located outside the United States.
- Federal agency short-term securities – In the U.S., short-term securities issued by government sponsored enterprises such as the Farm Credit System, the Federal Home Loan Banks and the Federal National Mortgage Association. Money markets is heavily used function.
- Federal funds – In the U.S., interest-bearing deposits held by banks and other depository institutions at the Federal Reserve; these are immediately available funds that institutions borrow or lend, usually on an overnight basis. They are lent for the federal funds rate.
- Municipal notes – In the U.S., short-term notes issued by municipalities in anticipation of tax receipts or other revenues
- U.S. Treasury bills are short-term government securities with maturities from four to 52 weeks. They are sold at a discount or at face value and pay their face value at maturity, so the difference between the purchase price and face value constitutes the investor's interest. TreasuryDirect lists regular maturities of 4, 6, 8, 13, 17, 26, and 52 weeks, while cash-management bills may be issued for other terms.
- Money funds – Pooled short-maturity, high-quality investments that buy money market securities on behalf of retail or institutional investors
- Foreign exchange swaps – Exchanging a set of currencies in spot date and the reversal of the exchange of currencies at a predetermined time in the future
- Short-lived mortgage- and asset-backed securities

=== Discount and accrual instruments ===
There are two types of instruments in the fixed income market that pay interest at maturity, instead of as coupons—discount instruments and accrual instruments. Discount instruments, like repurchase agreements, are issued at a discount of face value, and their maturity value is the face value. Accrual instruments are issued at face value and mature at face value plus interest.

== See also ==
- Interbank lending market
- Liquidity crisis
- Lombard Street: A Description of the Money Market – One of the earliest popular books on the money market
- Money fund
- Money market account
- Money supply
- Demand for money
- Liquidity preference
- Overnight market
- Sweep account
