= Mortgage industry of the United States =

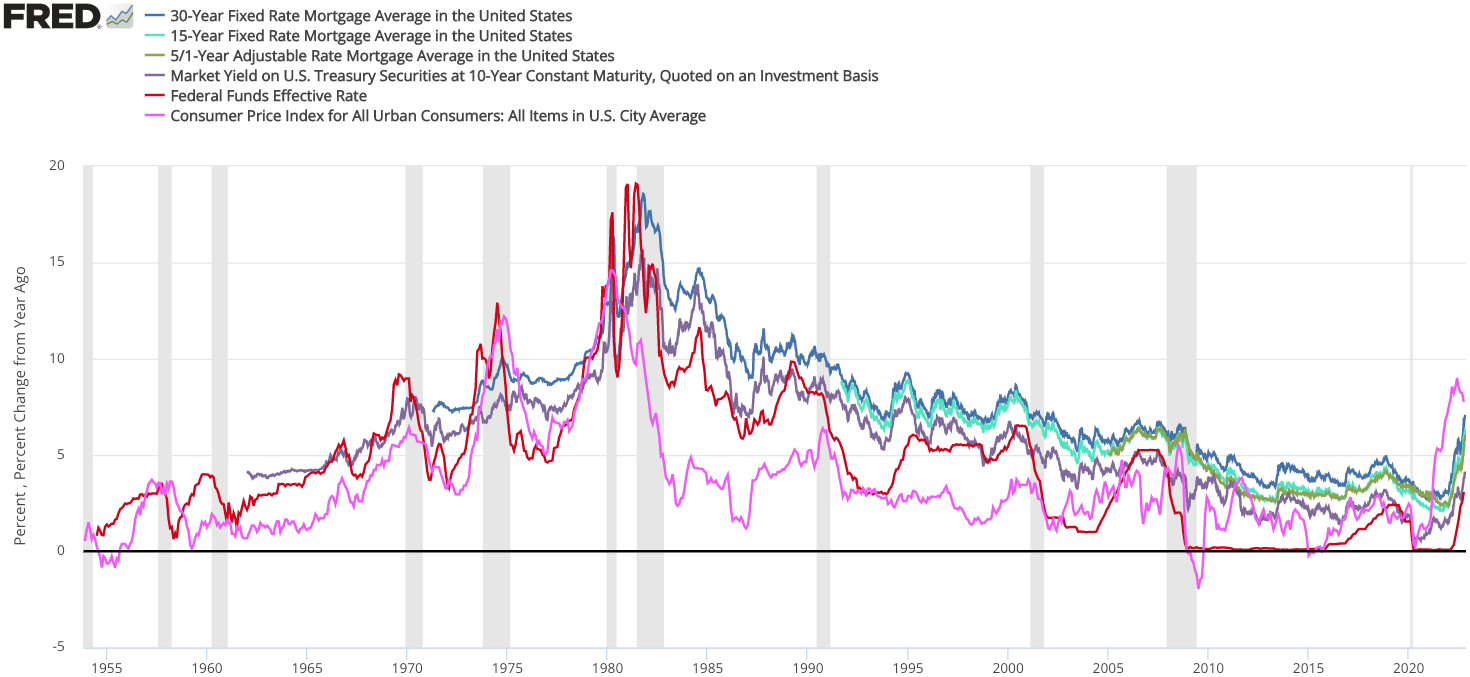
Mortgages and interest rates 30 year fixed rate mortgage 15 year fixed rate mortgage 5/1 adjustable rate mortgage 10 year treasury yield Effective Federal funds rate Inflation Consumer price index

Historical U.S. Prime Rates

The mortgage industry of the United States is a major financial sector. The federal government created several programs, or government sponsored entities, to foster mortgage lending, construction and encourage home ownership. These programs include the Government National Mortgage Association (known as Ginnie Mae), the Federal National Mortgage Association (known as Fannie Mae) and the Federal Home Loan Mortgage Corporation (known as Freddie Mac).

The subprime mortgage crisis was one of the first indication of the 2008 financial crisis, characterized by a rise in subprime mortgage delinquencies and foreclosures, and the resulting decline of securities backing said mortgages. The earlier savings and loan crisis of the 1980s and 1990s and the national mortgage crisis of the 1930s also arose primarily from unsound mortgage lending. The mortgage crisis has led to a rise in foreclosures, leading to the 2010 United States foreclosure crisis.

== Mortgage lenders ==
Mortgage lending is a major sector finance in the United States, and many of the guidelines that loans must meet are suited to satisfy investors and mortgage insurers. Mortgages are debt securities and can be conveyed and assigned freely to other holders. In the U.S., the Federal government created several programs, or government sponsored entities, to foster mortgage lending, construction and encourage home ownership. These programs include the Government National Mortgage Association (known as Ginnie Mae), the Federal National Mortgage Association (known as Fannie Mae) and the Federal Home Loan Mortgage Corporation (known as Freddie Mac). These programs work by offering a guarantee on the mortgage payments of certain conforming loans. These loans are then securitized and issued at a slightly lower interest rate to investors, and are known as mortgage-backed securities (MBS). After securitization these are sometimes called "agency paper" or "agency bonds". Whether or not a loan is conforming depends on the size and set of guidelines which are implemented in an automated underwriting system. Non-conforming mortgage loans which cannot be sold to Fannie or Freddie are either "jumbo" or "subprime", and can also be packaged into mortgage-backed securities. Some companies, called correspondent lenders, sell all or most of their closed loans to these investors, accepting some risks for issuing them. They often offer niche loans at higher prices that the investor does not wish to originate.

Securitization allows the banks to quickly relend the money to other borrowers (including in the form of mortgages) and thereby to create more mortgages than the banks could with the amount they have on deposit. This in turn allows the public to use these mortgages to purchase homes, something the government wishes to encourage. Investors in conforming loans, meanwhile, gain low-risk income at a higher interest rate (essentially the mortgage rate, minus the cuts of the bank and GSE) than they could gain from most other bonds. Securitization has grown rapidly in the last 10 years as a result of the wider dissemination of technology in the mortgage lending world. For borrowers with superior credit, government loans and ideal profiles, this securitization keeps rates almost artificially low, since the pools of funds used to create new loans can be refreshed more quickly than in years past, allowing for more rapid outflow of capital from investors to borrowers without as many personal business ties as in the past.

The increased amount of lending led (among other factors) to the United States housing bubble of 2000-2006. The growth of lightly regulated derivative instruments based on mortgage-backed securities, such as collateralized debt obligations and credit default swaps, is widely reported as a major causative factor behind the subprime mortgage crisis. As a result of the housing bubble, many banks, including Fannie Mae, established tighter lending guidelines which made it much more difficult to obtain a loan.

=== Predatory mortgage lending ===
There is concern in the U.S. that consumers are often victims of predatory mortgage lending . The main concern is that mortgage lenders and brokers, operating legally, are finding loopholes in the law to obtain additional profit. The typical scenario is that terms of the loan are beyond the means of the ill-informed and uneducated borrower. The borrower makes a number of interest and principal payments, and then defaults. The lender then takes the property and recovers the amount of the loan, and also keeps the interest and principal payments, as well as loan origination fees.

== U.S. mortgage process ==
=== Origination ===
In the U.S., the process by which a mortgage is secured by a borrower is called origination. This involves the borrower submitting a loan application and documentation related to his/her financial history and/or credit history to the underwriter, which is typically a bank. Sometimes, a third party is involved, such as a mortgage broker. This entity takes the borrower's information and reviews a number of lenders, selecting the ones that will best meet the needs of the consumer. Origination is regulated by laws including the Truth in Lending Act and Real Estate Settlement Procedures Act (1974). Credit scores are often used, and these must comply with the Fair Credit Reporting Act. Additionally, various state laws may apply. Underwriters receive the application and determine whether the loan can be accepted. If the underwriter is not satisfied with the documentation provided by the borrower, additional documentation and conditions may be imposed, called stipulations.

Documentation and credit history can be used to categorize loans into high-quality A-paper, Alt-A, and subprime. Loans may also be categorized by whether there is full documentation, alternative documentation, or little to no documentations, with extreme "no income no job no asset" loans referred to as "NINJA" loans. No doc loans were popular in the early 2000s, but were largely phased out following the subprime mortgage crisis. Low-doc loans carry a higher interest rate and were theoretically available only to borrowers with excellent credit and additional income that may be hard to document (e.g. self-employment income). As of July 2010, no-doc loans were reportedly still being offered, but more selectively and with high down payment requirements (e.g., 40%).

The following documents are typically required for traditional underwriter review. Over the past several years, use of "automated underwriting" statistical models has reduced the amount of documentation required from many borrowers. Such automated underwriting engines include Freddie Mac's "Loan Product Advisor" (fka "Loan Prospector") and Fannie Mae's "Desktop Underwriter". For borrowers who have excellent credit and very acceptable debt positions, there may be virtually no documentation of income or assets required at all. Many of these documents are also not required for no-doc and low-doc loans.

- Credit Report
- 1003 — Uniform Residential Loan Application
- 1004 — Uniform Residential Appraisal Report
- 1005 — Verification Of Employment (VOE)
- 1006 — Verification Of Deposit (VOD)
- 1007 — Single Family Comparable Rent Schedule
- 1008 — Transmittal Summary
- Copy of deed of current home
- Federal income tax records for last two years
- Verification of Mortgage (VOM) or Verification of Payment (VOP)
- Borrower's Authorization
- Purchase Sales Agreement
- 1084A and 1084B (Self-Employed Income Analysis) and 1088 (Comparative Income Analysis) - used if borrower is self-employed

=== Closing costs ===
In addition to the down payment, the final deal of the mortgage includes closing costs which include fees for "points" to lower the interest rate, application fees, credit report fees, attorney fees, title insurance, appraisal fees, inspection fees, underwriting fee and other possible miscellaneous fees. These fees can sometimes be financed and added to the mortgage amount. In 2010, one survey estimated that the average total closing cost United States on a $200,000 house was $3,741.

=== Market indices ===
Common indices in the U.S. include the U.S. Prime Rate, the London Interbank Offered Rate (LIBOR), and the Treasury Index ("T-Bill"); other indices are in use but are less popular.

In the U.S., the fixed rate mortgage term is usually up to 30 years (15 and 30 being the most common), although longer terms may be offered in certain circumstances. Freddie Mac conducts a weekly survey of lenders on the rates and points for the most popular mortgage products.

In September 2026, the 30-year mortgage rate reached 7 per cent for the first time in nearly two years, adding to affordability pressures on households.

== International comparisons ==
Fixed-rate mortgage are common in the United States, unlike most of Western Europe where variable-rate mortgages are more common. The United States has home ownership rates comparable to Europe, but overall default rates are lower in Europe than in the United States. Mortgage loan financing relies more on secondary mortgage markets and less on formal government guarantees backed by covered bonds and deposits. Prepayment penalties are discouraged by underwriting requirements of large organizations such as Fannie Mae and Freddie Mac. Mortgages loans are often nonrecourse debt, unlike most of the world.

== See also ==
- Mortgage underwriting in the United States
- Glossary of US mortgage terminology
- Savings and loan association
- Mortgage industry of Russia
