= TIBOR =

Reference rate in Japan

The Tokyo Interbank Offered Rate (TIBOR) is a daily reference rate based on the interest rates at which banks offer to lend unsecured funds to other banks in the Japan wholesale money market (or interbank market). TIBOR is published daily by the JBA TIBOR Administration.

== Technical features ==
TIBOR is calculated based on the quotes for different maturities provided by reference banks at about 11.00 a.m. each business day.

There are two forms of TIBOR rates:

- Japanese Yen TIBOR rate - This was introduced in November 1995. It reflects rates in the unsecured call market.
- Euroyen TIBOR rate - This was introduced in March 1998. It reflects rates in the offshore market. This will be terminated in 2024.

== See also ==
- TONAR - Tokyo Overnight Average Rate
- Interbank lending market
- Euribor
- LIBOR
- SIBOR
- HIBOR
