= Mortgage Assumption Value =

The mortgage assumption value (MAV) is the cash equivalent, at the current point in time, of all future savings that could be achieved by assuming an existing low-interest-rate home mortgage loan rather than taking out a new higher interest rate loan and accounting for the time value of money.

This value is associated with a specific mortgage and fluctuates as currently, available interest rates vary relative to the subject mortgage. Value is created and grows whenever the prevailing interest rate for a new mortgage loan is greater than and increasing when compared to the interest rate of the assumable mortgage. Similarly, the mortgage assumption value shrinks as market rates fall and hits zero if the market rate is less than or equal to the rate on the assumable mortgage.

VA loans can be assumed by anyone and are not required to be passed on to another veteran.

== Calculation ==
The mortgage assumption value can be calculated as the net present value of the sum of the future monthly payment savings due to the assumable loan rate being lower than the prevailing new loan interest rate. The calculation may take different forms, below are two examples:

1. Calculate the monthly payment for a new hypothetical loan using the prevailing rate, current unpaid principal balance of the assumable loan, and remaining term in months on original assumable loan. Take the difference between this higher payment and the original assumable payment yielding the monthly savings amount. Last, discount using the prevailing rate the series of monthly savings to current value at prevailing rates.
2. Discount the remaining series of payments from the assumable loan using the prevailing rate as the discount rate. Then take the difference between this net present value and the actual unpaid principal balance. This also yields the mortgage assumption value and is computationally simpler than the first approach.

== Example ==
An illustrative example using the 30-year fixed rate mortgage (historically the most common mortgage type in the United States) for comparison:

A $100,000 assumable mortgage loan with a 4.00% rate has a corresponding monthly loan payment of $477.42. In this example let’s say the loan is assumed after 3 years (36 months) and that the unpaid principal balance will have reduced to $94,499. Now calculate the payment at a prevailing rate of 6.00%, principal of $94,499 and term of 27 years (original 30 years less 3 years until assumption) and the hypothetical payment is would be $589.66. Take the difference between this hypothetical payment and the actual assumable payment to calculate a monthly savings of $112.24. Now discount using a prevailing rate of 6.00% the 324-month (27 years) series of $112.24 hypothetical cash flows to yield a [net present value] of $17,988.

== See also ==
- Mortgage note
- Mortgage assumption
