= Glossary of US mortgage terminology =

Terms pertaining to American mortgages include:

Main two types

Origination and Re-Financing

- Origination: starting from the scrap, Ex, A person wants to buy a home and goes to the bank for the same will get loan of 80% of their LTV.
- Re-finance: defaulted borrower can apply for the same refinancing procedure to re modify the loan term, interest rate.

== Mortgage types ==
- Adjustable rate mortgage or ARM - A mortgage where the interest rate adjusts relative to a specified index + margin. E.g. COFI, LIBOR etc.
- Hybrid ARM - An adjustable rate mortgage where the initial 'start' rate is fixed for some portion of time (3,5,7, or 10 years) thereafter the interest rate adjusts (yearly or bi-annually) based on the sum of a specified index + margin. E.g. 2/28 Arm, 3/1 Arm, 5/1 Arm, 7/1 Arm, 10/1 Arm, 3/6month arm, etc...
- Fixed rate mortgage or FRM - A mortgage where the interest rate and payment are fixed for the term of the loan.
- Negative amortization mortgage - where the payment may be less than the monthly accrued interest, and the outstanding interest is capitalized monthly into the loan balance.
- Balloon payment mortgage - A mortgage most commonly used in commercial real estate. The Balloon payment mortgage does not fully amortize over the term of the note, which leaves a balance due at maturity, known as a "balloon payment."
- Interest only mortgage - A type of mortgage where the borrower pays only the accruing interest on the principal balance. These payments on interest leave the principal balance unchanged.

== Terminology ==
- Yield spread premium
- A par rate is the lowest interest rate a borrower qualifies for, given by the lender.
- Reset: interest rate and thus payments change periodically on ARMs.

== See also ==
- Mortgage loan
- UK mortgage terminology
