= Mortgage assumption =

Mortgage assumption is the conveyance of the terms and balance of an existing mortgage to the purchaser of a financed property, commonly requiring that the assuming party is qualified under lender or guarantor guidelines. All mortgages are potentially assumable, though lenders may attempt to prevent the assumption of a mortgage loan with a due-on-sale clause. Certain mortgage types are irrefutably assumable, such as those insured by the FHA, guaranteed by the VA, or guaranteed by the USDA. As of 2014, FHA and VA assumable mortgages make up approximately 18%, or one out of every six, mortgages in the United States.

== Overview ==
Mortgage assumption more commonly referred to as 'Assumable Mortgages', allow the purchaser of a home to take over the existing terms of the mortgage including; the interest rate, maturity date, remaining balance. Mortgage assumptions have gained popularity since 2022, a response to rapidly rising interest rates. Mortgage assumption has become a way that buyers can purchase a home at the low rates of the past and potentially save money on their monthly payment and total interest costs.

The assumption of a mortgage by the purchaser is typically included as part of the deed, although there is no requirement that it has to be in writing. In most jurisdictions, an explicit assumption is required. If a deed is silent or ambiguous on the matter, the court will assume the purchaser did not intend to assume the mortgage.

However, some allow the assumption to be implied based on the behavior of the parties. For example, making payments on the mortgage can evince an intent to assume it, as can paying less than the value of the property (if the difference is the amount outstanding on the mortgage). Absent an assumption of the mortgage by the purchaser, the purchaser buys the property subject to the mortgage, which means the property is still encumbered and the lender has an interest in the property.

== How to find assumable mortgages ==
Assumable mortgages are not consistently identified on mainstream real estate platforms such as Zillow or Redfin, which makes them difficult for buyers to locate. To address this gap, dedicated databases have emerged. Assumable.io has been described in U.S. media as the only nationwide platform that tracks and lists homes with FHA, VA, and USDA assumable mortgage homes, with tens of thousands of properties cataloged across thousands of cities in all 50 states.

== Example ==
For example, a homeowner owes a 30-year mortgage loan of $250,000 against his house. A prospective buyer wants to purchase the house for $300,000 and keep the same mortgage to avoid going through the process and expense of applying for a new loan. The buyer pays $50,000 cash for the equity and assumes the $250,000 mortgage, assuming ownership of the loan and maintaining its existing terms, including the interest rate.

== Common assumable mortgages ==
1. FHA Insured Loans – All mortgages executed after December 1, 1986, require that the buyer be creditworthy to assume a seller’s mortgage.
2. VA Loans - All mortgages executed after March 1, 1988, require that the buyer be creditworthy to assume a seller’s mortgage. If a VA Loan is being assumed by a veteran with a home loan eligibility, the seller may also request to have their eligibility re-instated upon completion of the assumption.
3. USDA Loans – All USDA 502 mortgages are assumable by a creditworthy buyer, but as a new rate and terms assumption.
4. Adjustable-rate mortgages – commonly are assumable, though not all.

== Consent of lender ==
In order to assume an existing mortgage loan it is generally necessary to obtain consent from the lender prior to the assumption process. Transfer of property with an existing mortgage loan that is made without the lender's consent is sometimes referred to as a sale "subject to" the existing loan. In most cases, this type of transfer does not avoid the lender's right to call the loan due under the due-on-sale provision in the loan.

=== Exceptions ===
1. VA Loans dated prior to March 1, 1988 can be transferred without the approval of the lender, and the seller may still be released from liability on the mortgage loan.
2. FHA-insured loans originated before December 1, 1986, generally contain no restrictions on assumability. Due to the HUD Reform Act of 1989 FHA mortgages executed between 1986 and 1989 are freely assumable, despite any restrictions stated in the mortgage.

== Release of liability ==
Upon completion of the assumption, the seller requests a release of liability from the lender. If the mortgage is assumed without the lender’s consent, the seller would remain liable for any default on the part of the buyer. In cases of a VA Loan, a release of liability may be obtained after the assumption even if the lender’s approval was not given prior to the completion of the assumption process.

== Restriction on assumption ==
In the United States, mortgage assumption of most types of mortgages is restricted by including a due-on-sale clause. This type of provision permits the lender to require payment of the full loan balance if the property is transferred to a new owner without the lender's consent. However, all FHA-insured loans and VA loans (dated after March 1, 1988) are assumable as long as the buyer is creditworthy because they intentionally lack due on sale clauses. Not every type of loan is assumable.

== See also ==
- Due-on-sale clause
- Mortgage note
- Mortgage law
- Mortgage Assumption Value
