= Graduated payments =

Repayment terms

Graduated payments are repayment terms that gradually increase over the life of a closed-end obligation. A graduated payment loan typically involves negative amortization and is intended for students, in the case of student loans, and homebuyers, in the case of real estate. These individuals generally have moderate incomes with the expectation of increased income over the next 5–10 years.

All Federal Housing Administration (FHA) lenders can offer an FHA Graduated payment mortgage loan with lower monthly payments that increase annually over the first 5–10 years of the loan, before leveling out to a fixed monthly payment for the remaining years of the mortgage. There are five FHA Graduated Payment Mortgages offered in 15-year and 30-year terms. The difference between the plans lies in the rate of increase of the mortgage payment, which annually increases 2.5%, 5%, or 7.5% until it levels off.
