= Sibour =

Sibour is a surname. Notable people with the surname include:

- Jules Henri de Sibour (1872–1938), French architect
- Marie-Dominique-Auguste Sibour (1792–1857), Catholic Archbishop of Paris, assassinated by a priest

== See also ==
- SIBOR
- Sibur
