= Unpaid principal balance =

Portion of a loan not remitted to the lender

Unpaid principal balance (UPB) is the portion of a loan (e.g. a mortgage loan) at a certain point in time that has not yet been remitted to the lender.

For a typical consumer loan such as a home mortgage or automobile loan, the original unpaid principal balance is the amount borrowed, and therefore the amount the borrower owes the lender on the origination date of the loan.

The unpaid principal balance will decrease as time goes on for the loans that are structured with level payments. For these common loans, each monthly payment includes both interest and principal. The unpaid principal balance at the beginning of a given month is reduced by that portion of the level payment that is designated principal for that month; so that the unpaid principal balance at the end of the month is the beginning UPB less the principal paid for the month. Hence, the UPB decreases over time.

== Example ==
Showing how UPB decreases each month

A $100,000 loan with an original UPB with a nominal 6% annual rate loan. The monthly interest rate is therefore .5% (6% divided by 12 months). The level monthly payment for a 30-year mortgage loan is $599.55.

The UPB at the end of first month is calculated as follows:

Principal paid in first payment of $599.55

1. The first month interest of .5% of $100,000.00 yields $500.00
2. $599.55 monthly payment less $500.00 interest yields $99.55 as the principal amount in the first monthly payment
3. $100,000.00 original UPB less $99.55 yields the UPB at the end of the first month (beginning of second month) of $99,900.45
4. This process is repeated for each subsequent month to calculate the UPB on a monthly basis.

== See also ==
- Due-on-sale clause
- Mortgage note
- Mortgage law
- Mortgage Assumption Value
