= Wraparound mortgage =

Form of secondary financing

A wraparound mortgage, more commonly known as a "wrap", is a form of secondary financing for the purchase of real property. The seller extends to the buyer a junior mortgage which wraps around and exists in addition to any superior mortgages already secured by the property. Under a wrap, a seller accepts a secured promissory note from the buyer for the amount due on the underlying mortgage plus an amount up to the remaining purchase money balance.

The new purchaser makes monthly payments to the seller, who is then responsible for making the payments to the underlying mortgagee(s). Should the new purchaser default on those payments, the seller then has the right of foreclosure to recapture the subject property.

Because wraps are a form of seller financing, they have the effect of lowering the barriers to ownership of real property; they also can expedite the process of purchasing a home. An example:

The seller, who has the original mortgage sells his home with the existing first mortgage in place and a second mortgage which he "carries back" from the buyer. The mortgage he takes from the buyer is for the amount of the first mortgage plus a negotiated amount less than or up to the sales price, minus any down payment and closing costs. The monthly payments are made by the buyer to the seller, who then continues to pay the first mortgage with the proceeds. When the buyer either sells or refinances the property, all mortgages are paid off in full, with the seller entitled to the difference in the payoff of the wrap and any underlying loan payoffs.

Typically, the seller also charges a spread. For example, a seller may have a mortgage at 6% and sell the property at a rate of 8% on a wraparound mortgage. He then would be making a 2% spread on the payments each month (roughly). The difference in principal amounts and amortization schedules will affect the actual spread made.

As title is actually transferred from seller to buyer, wraparound mortgage transactions may give the bank or other mortgagees the right to call the superior notes due, based on the due-on-sale clause of the underlying mortgage(s), if such a clause is present. It is appropriate to note that the bank or other mortgagees may elect to continue to receive interest payments even in the case where they become aware of the transfer of ownership. If the mortgage remains current (and especially if the new buyer brings a formerly-defaulted mortgage current again) the original lender has no real incentive to elect acceleration of the note since they remain in a secure position.

== Benefits ==
Buyers who cannot qualify for loans from traditional lenders may use wraps to facilitate a transaction. The standard to qualify for a wrap depends on each specific seller, which creates the potential for a wider buyer pool.

Due to heightened credit risk, sellers may earn a higher interest rate on a wrap than lenders generally earn on conventional mortgages.

== Risks ==
Because the wrap-around mortgage is a junior lien, the seller indirectly takes on the risk of the buyer defaulting on their original mortgage. In such an event, the lender of the original mortgage (not the wrap-around) could foreclose the property and take it away from the buyer. This risk can be mitigated by allowing the buyer to make payments directly to the original lender, rather than through the seller (who then has to be trusted to continue making payments).

Wraps also introduce legal risk for sellers, as the original lender must agree to the secondary loan. Sellers must ensure compliance with the terms of their original loan and they continue to bear full responsibility for making payments on their mortgage. If the buyer defaults on the wrap, the seller has to continue paying the mortgage or else the property may be foreclosed.
