= Due-on-sale clause =

A due-on-sale clause is a clause in a loan or promissory note that stipulates that the full balance of the loan may be called due (repaid in full) upon sale or transfer of ownership of the property used to secure the note. The lender has the right, but not the obligation, to call the note due in such a circumstance.

In real estate investing, the due-on-sale clause can be an impediment for a property owner who wishes to sell the property and have the buyer take over an existing loan rather than paying the loan off as part of the sale. Likewise, a due-on-sale clause would interfere with a seller's extension of financing to a buyer by using a wraparound mortgage, also called an "all-inclusive mortgage", "all-inclusive deed of trust", "all-inclusive trust deed", or "AITD." Any of these arrangements triggers the due-on-sale clause in the seller's existing mortgage and thus the lender may call the loan due. If a property with a due-on-sale clause in the mortgage loan is transferred and the loan is not paid off, the bank could call the loan and then foreclose on the property if the buyer is unable to immediately tender the entire remaining balance on the loan. How likely this is depends on how the real estate economy is doing. If the buyer continues to pay the loan payments when due, it is less likely that the bank would actually call the loan due but it is still the bank's choice.

In the early 1980s, with interest rates on new loans at 18%, banks frequently attempted to enforce due-on-sale clauses with respect to older loans that had been made at lower interest rates (especially those made prior to the 1973–75 recession and the ensuing stagflation), so they could retire those loans from their books, force buyers to obtain new loans to fund their transactions, and lend funds to them at higher interest rates. In the lending market of the 2010s, many observers believe that banks are not likely to enforce due-on-sale provisions unless they have another reason to call the loan due.

== United States law ==
Virtually all mortgage loans made in the United States by institutional lenders in recent years contain a due-on-sale clause. These clauses are meant to require the loan to be paid in full in the case of a sale or conveyance of interest in the subject property. This is in contrast to the wide availability of assumable mortgages in the past. Assumable mortgages would allow a second party to assume the position of borrower and essentially adopt the agreement that is already in place between the buyer and the financial institution. Until 1982, the enforceability of due-on-sale provisions was basically a matter of state, not federal, law. Many states had adopted laws that permitted existing loans to be assumed by buyers whether or not the lender was willing to agree. The logic behind these laws was generally that a lender should be permitted to call a loan due when the property securing the loan is sold only if the lender could demonstrate that the sale and transfer of the property reduced the lender's security or increased the risk that the loan would go into default.

However, in 1982 Congress passed the Garn–St. Germain Depository Institutions Act. Section 341a of the Act (codified in Title 12, U.S. Code, Section 1701j-3) makes the enforceability of due-on-sale provisions a federal issue and provides that if real estate loan documents contain a due-on-sale provision, that provision is enforceable if the property securing the loan is transferred without the lender's consent. Institutional lenders successfully lobbied Congress heavily to add Section 341a of the Act to federal law.

Lenders are generally not required to include due-on-sale provisions in loans, but it is nearly universal practice for institutional lenders to include them. For loans by private lenders, such as financing extended to buyers by sellers, due-on-sale provisions are not always included. Also, a buyer and seller could negotiate to include due-on-sale clause that allows a one-time loan assumption.

There are certain exceptions to enforceability of due-on-sale clauses. These are generally contained in Title 12, Code of Federal Regulations, part 191. For example, borrowers may place their homes in their own trust without triggering the due-on-sale clause. "A lender may not exercise its option pursuant to a due-on-sale clause upon a transfer into an inter vivos trust in which the borrower is and remains a beneficiary and which does not relate to a transfer of rights of occupancy in the property." (12 U.S.C. 1701j-3(d)(8)..[5].) Note that a beneficiary means possibly among multiple beneficiaries. Similarly, transfer of the borrower's home to a spouse as part of a divorce or dissolution of marriage generally does not trigger a due-on-sale clause. There are other exemptions in the law as well. Use trusts also facilitates transfers of property to heirs and minors. It may also protect the property of wealthy or risky owners against the possibility of future lawsuits or creditors because the trust, not the individuals at risk, owns the property.

== See also ==
- Promissory note
- Mortgage assumption
- Mortgage note
- Mortgage law
