= Florida Stallion Stakes =

American series of Thoroughbred horse races

The Florida Stallion Stakes is an American series of Thoroughbred horse races run annually at Calder Race Course in Miami Gardens, Florida. Created in 1982 to benefit the Florida Thoroughbred breeding industry, it is open to two-year-olds sired by a nominated Florida stallion and raced over three months at increasing distances.

In order for a horse to run in the Florida Stallion Stakes series, their sire must have been nominated each year for a set fee which makes all of that stallions' foals eligible to participate. Graduated payments are required over a nineteen-month period in order to maintain the foals' eligibility.

In 1984, Smile became the first horse to ever win all three legs of the Florida Stallion Stakes.

In 2009, due to the rising popularity of the Florida Stallion Stakes, the Florida Thoroughbred Breeders’ and Owners’ Association, in partnership with Florida stallion owners, announced an agreement with the Florida Horsemen’s Benevolent and Protective Association and Churchill Downs Inc., to bring significant changes to juvenile racing at Calder Race Course. One of the biggest changes being made is the scheduling of the races. Traditionally the last leg of both the colt and the filly races have been held very near or on the date of the Breeder's Cup World Championship which often forced trainers to decide between going to the Breeder's Cup and the Florida Stallion Stakes. "The [new] agreement calls for the legs to be scheduled at least three weeks apart, including the time between the final legs and the Breeders’ Cup." Richard Hancock, executive vice president of the FTBOA, hopes that this will encourage Florida trainers to use the races a preparatory events to get their horses ready to compete in the Breeder’s Cup.

== Florida Stallion Stakes ==
Each race is named in honor of a horse bred in Florida.

Two-year-old filly divisions:

- Desert Vixen Stakes - 6 furlongs in August
- Susan's Girl Stakes - 7 furlongs in September
- My Dear Girl Stakes - 8.5 furlongs (1^{1}/16 miles) in October

Two-year-old colt divisions:

- Dr. Fager Stakes - 6 furlongs in August
- Affirmed Stakes - 7 furlongs in September
- In Reality Stakes - 8.5 furlongs (1^{1}/16 miles) in October
