= Adjustable-rate mortgage =

Mortgage loan with an interest rate that changes based on credit markets

A variable-rate mortgage, adjustable-rate mortgage (ARM), or tracker mortgage is a mortgage loan with the interest rate on the note periodically adjusted based on an index which reflects the cost to the lender of borrowing on the credit markets. The loan may be offered at the lender's standard variable rate/base rate. There may be a direct and legally defined link to the underlying index, but where the lender offers no specific link to the underlying market or index, the rate can be changed at the lender's discretion. The term "variable-rate mortgage" is most common outside the United States, whilst in the United States, "adjustable-rate mortgage" is most common, and implies a mortgage regulated by the Federal government, with caps on charges. In many countries, adjustable rate mortgages are the norm, and in such places, may simply be referred to as mortgages.

Among the most common indices are the rates on 1-year constant-maturity Treasury (CMT) securities, the cost of funds index (COFI), and the London Interbank Offered Rate (LIBOR). A few lenders use their own cost of funds as an index, rather than using other indices. This is done to ensure a steady margin for the lender, whose own cost of funding will usually be related to the index. Consequently, payments made by the borrower may change over time with the changing interest rate (alternatively, the term of the loan may change). This is distinct from the graduated payment mortgage, which offers changing payment amounts but a fixed interest rate. Other forms of mortgage loan include the interest-only mortgage, the fixed-rate mortgage, the negative amortization mortgage, and the balloon payment mortgage.

Adjustable rates transfer part of the interest rate risk from the lender to the borrower. They can be used where unpredictable interest rates make fixed rate loans difficult to obtain. The borrower benefits if the interest rate falls but loses if the interest rate increases. The borrower also benefits from reduced margins to the underlying cost of borrowing compared to fixed or capped rate mortgages.

In contrast to fixed-rate mortgages, adjustable-rate mortgages are unaffected by inflation risk, but they are exposed to the risk that real interest rates will change. Adjustable-rate mortgages usually charge lower interest rates than those with fixed rates. According to scholars, "borrowers should generally prefer adjustable-rate over fixed-rate mortgages, unless interest rates are low."

== Characteristics ==
=== Index ===
- 11th District Cost of Funds Index (COFI)
- London Interbank Offered Rate (LIBOR)
- 12-month Treasury Average Index (MTA)
- Constant Maturity Treasury (CMT)
- National Average Contract Mortgage Rate
- Bank Bill Swap Rate (BBSW)
- Consumer Price Index (CPI)

In some countries, banks may publish a prime lending rate which is used as the index. The index may be applied in one of three ways: directly, on a rate plus margin basis, or based on index movement.

A directly applied index means that the interest rate changes exactly with the index. In other words, the interest rate on the note exactly equals the index. Of the above indices, only the contract rate index is applied directly.

To apply an index on a rate plus margin basis means that the interest rate will equal the underlying index plus a margin. The margin is specified in the note and remains fixed over the life of the loan. For example, a mortgage interest rate may be specified in the note as being LIBOR plus 2%, with 2% being the margin and LIBOR being the index.

The final way to apply an index is on a movement basis. In this scheme, the mortgage is originated at an agreed upon rate, then adjusted based on the movement of the index. Unlike direct or index plus margin, the initial rate is not explicitly tied to any index; the adjustments are tied to an index.

=== Basic features ===
The most important basic features of ARMs are:

1. Initial interest rate. This is the beginning interest rate on an ARM.
2. The adjustment period. This is the length of time that the interest rate or loan period on an ARM is scheduled to remain unchanged. The rate is reset at the end of this period, and the monthly loan payment is recalculated.
3. The index rate. Most lenders tie ARM interest rates changes to changes in an index rate. Lenders base ARM rates on a variety of indices, the most common being rates on one-, three-, or five-year Treasury securities. Another common index is the national or regional average cost of funds to savings and loan associations.
4. The margin. This is the percentage points that lenders add to the index rate to determine the ARM's interest rate.
5. Interest rate caps. These are the limits on how much the interest rate or the monthly payment can be changed at the end of each adjustment period or over the life of the loan.
6. Initial discounts. These are interest rate concessions, often used as promotional aids, offered the first year or more of a loan. They reduce the interest rate below the prevailing rate (the index plus the margin).
7. Negative amortization. This means the mortgage balance is increasing. This occurs whenever the monthly mortgage payments are not large enough to pay all the interest due on the mortgage. This may be caused when the payment cap contained in the ARM is low enough such that the principal plus interest payment is greater than the payment cap.
8. Conversion. The agreement with the lender may have a clause that allows the buyer to convert the ARM to a fixed-rate mortgage at designated times.
9. Prepayment. Some agreements may require the buyer to pay special fees or penalties if the ARM is paid off early. Prepayment terms are sometimes negotiable.

The choice of a home mortgage loan is complicated and time consuming. As a help to the buyer, the Federal Reserve Board and the Federal Home Loan Bank Board have prepared a mortgage checklist.

=== Caps ===
Any mortgage where payments made by the borrower may increase over time brings with it the risk of financial hardship to the borrower. To limit this risk, limitations on charges—known as caps in the industry—are a common feature of adjustable rate mortgages. Caps typically apply to three characteristics of the mortgage:

- frequency of the interest rate change
- periodic change in interest rate
- total change in interest rate over the life of the loan, sometimes called life cap

For example, a given ARM might have the following types of interest rate adjustment caps:

- interest adjustments made every six months, typically 1% per adjustment, 2% total per year
- interest adjustments made only once a year, typically 2% maximum
- interest rate may adjust no more than 1% in a year

Mortgage payment adjustment caps:

- maximum mortgage payment adjustments, usually 7.5% annually on pay-option/negative amortization loans

Life of loan interest rate adjustment caps:

- total interest rate adjustment limited to 5% or 6% for the life of the loan.

Caps on the periodic change in interest rate may be broken up into one limit on the first periodic change and a separate limit on subsequent periodic change, for example 5% on the initial adjustment and 2% on subsequent adjustments.

Although uncommon, a cap may limit the maximum monthly payment in absolute terms (for example, $1000 a month), rather than in relative terms.

ARMs that allow negative amortization will typically have payment adjustments that occur less frequently than the interest rate adjustment. For example, the interest rate may be adjusted every month, but the payment amount only once every 12 months.

Cap structure is sometimes expressed as initial adjustment cap / subsequent adjustment cap / life cap, for example 2/2/5 for a loan with a 2% cap on the initial adjustment, a 2% cap on subsequent adjustments, and a 5% cap on total interest rate adjustments. When only two values are given, this indicates that the initial change cap and periodic cap are the same. For example, a 2/2/5 cap structure may sometimes be written simply 2/5.

== Motives ==
ARMs generally permit borrowers to lower their initial payments if they are willing to assume the risk of interest rate changes. There is evidence that consumers tend to prefer contracts with the lowest initial rates such as in the UK, where consumers tend to focus on immediate monthly mortgage costs. Decisions of consumers may also be affected by the advice that they get, and much of the advice is provided by lenders who may prefer ARMs because of financial market structures.

In many countries, banks or similar financial institutions are the primary originators of mortgages. For banks that are funded from customer deposits, the customer deposits typically have much shorter terms than residential mortgages. If a bank offered large volumes of mortgages at fixed rates but derived most of its funding from deposits (or other short-term sources of funds), it would have an asset–liability mismatch because of interest rate risk. It would then be running the risk that the interest income from its mortgage portfolio would be less than it needed to pay its depositors. In the United States, some argue that the savings and loan crisis was in part caused by the problem: the savings and loans companies had short-term deposits and long-term, fixed-rate mortgages and so were caught when Paul Volcker raised interest rates in the early 1980s. Therefore, banks and other financial institutions offer adjustable rate mortgages because it reduces risk and matches their sources of funding.

Banking regulators pay close attention to asset-liability mismatches to avoid such problems, and they place tight restrictions on the amount of long-term fixed-rate mortgages that banks may hold in relation to their other assets. To reduce the risk, many mortgage originators sell many of their mortgages, particularly the mortgages with fixed rates.

For the borrower, adjustable rate mortgages may be less expensive but at the price of bearing higher risk. Many ARMs have "teaser periods", which are relatively short initial fixed-rate periods (typically, one month to one year) when the ARM bears an interest rate that is substantially below the "fully indexed" rate. The teaser period may induce some borrowers to view an ARM as more of a bargain than it really represents. A low teaser rate predisposes an ARM to sustain above-average payment increases.

== Variants ==
=== Hybrid ARMs ===
A hybrid ARM features an interest rate that is fixed for an initial period of time, then floats thereafter. The "hybrid" refers to the ARM's blend of fixed-rate and adjustable-rate characteristics. Hybrid ARMs are referred to by their initial fixed-rate and adjustable-rate periods, for example, 3/1, is for an ARM with a 3-year fixed interest-rate period and subsequent 1-year interest-rate adjustment periods. The date that a hybrid ARM shifts from a fixed-rate payment schedule to an adjusting payment schedule is known as the reset date. After the reset date, a hybrid ARM floats at a margin over a specified index just like any ordinary ARM.

The popularity of hybrid ARMs significantly increased early in the 21st century. In 1998, the percentage of hybrids relative to 30-year fixed-rate mortgages was less than 2%; within six years, this increased to 27.5%.

Like other ARMs, hybrid ARMs transfer some interest-rate risk from the lender to the borrower, thus allowing the lender to offer a lower note rate in many interest-rate environments.

In 2026, around 150,000 U.S. homeowners with adjustable-rate mortgages were expected to see their interest rates change for the first time, which could lead to higher monthly payments.

=== Option ARMs ===
An "option ARM" is typically a 30-year ARM that initially offers the borrower four monthly payment options: a specified minimum payment, an interest-only payment, a 15-year fully amortizing payment, and a 30-year fully amortizing payment.

These types of loans are also called "pick-a-payment" or "pay-option" ARMs.

When a borrower makes a Pay-Option ARM payment that is less than the accruing interest, there is "negative amortization", which means that the unpaid portion of the accruing interest is added to the outstanding principal balance. For example, if the borrower makes a minimum payment of $1,000 and the ARM has accrued monthly interest of $1,500, $500 will be added to the borrower's loan balance. Moreover, the next month's interest-only payment will be calculated using the new, higher principal balance.

Option ARMs are often offered with a very low teaser rate (often as low as 1%) which translates into very low minimum payments for the first year of the ARM. During boom times, lenders often underwrite borrowers based on mortgage payments that are below the fully amortizing payment level. This enables borrowers to qualify for a much larger loan (i.e., take on more debt) than would otherwise be possible. When evaluating an Option ARM, prudent borrowers will not focus on the teaser rate or initial payment level, but will consider the characteristics of the index, the size of the "mortgage margin" that is added to the index value, and the other terms of the ARM. Specifically, they need to consider the possibilities that (1) long-term interest rates go up; (2) their home may not appreciate or may even lose value or even (3) that both risks may materialize.

Option ARMs are best suited to sophisticated borrowers with growing incomes, particularly if their incomes fluctuate seasonally and they need the payment flexibility that such an ARM may provide. Sophisticated borrowers will carefully manage the level of negative amortization that they allow to accrue.

In this way, a borrower can control the main risk of an Option ARM, which is "payment shock", when the negative amortization and other features of this product can trigger substantial payment increases in short periods of time.

The minimum payment on an Option ARM can jump dramatically if its unpaid principal balance hits the maximum limit on negative amortization (typically 110% to 125% of the original loan amount). If that happens, the next minimum monthly payment will be at a level that would fully amortize the ARM over its remaining term. In addition, Option ARMs typically have automatic "recast" dates (often every fifth year) when the payment is adjusted to get the ARM back on pace to amortize the ARM in full over its remaining term.

For example, a $200,000 ARM with a 110% "neg am" cap will typically adjust to a fully amortizing payment, based on the current fully indexed interest rate and the remaining term of the loan, if negative amortization causes the loan balance to exceed $220,000. For a 125% recast, this will happen if the loan balance reaches $250,000.

Any loan that is allowed to generate negative amortization means that the borrower is reducing his equity in his home, which increases the chance that he won't be able to sell it for enough to repay the loan. Declining property values would exacerbate this risk.

Option ARMs may also be available as "hybrids", with longer fixed-rate periods. These products would not be likely to have low teaser rates. As a result, such ARMs mitigate the possibility of negative amortization, and would likely not appeal to borrowers seeking an "affordability" product.

=== Cash flow ARMs ===
A cash flow ARM is a minimum payment option mortgage loan. This type of loan allows a borrower to choose their monthly payment from several options. These payment options usually include the option to pay at the 30-year level, 15-year level, interest only level, and a minimum payment level. The minimum payment level is usually lower than the interest only payment. This type of loan can result in negative amortization. The option to make a minimum payment is usually available only for the first several years of the loan.

Cash flow ARM mortgages are synonymous with option ARM or payment option ARM mortgages, however not all loans with cash flow options are adjustable. In fact, fixed rate cash flow option loans retain the same cash flow options as cash flow ARMs and option ARMs, but remain fixed for up to 30 years.

Terminology
Term	Definition
X/Y	Hybrid ARMs are often referred to in this format, where X is the number of years during which the initial interest rate applies prior to first adjustment (common terms are 3, 5, 7, and 10 years), and Y is the interval between adjustments (common terms are 1 for one year and 6 for six months). As an example, a 5/1 ARM means that the initial interest rate applies for five years (or 60 months, in terms of payments), after which the interest rate is adjusted annually. (Adjustments for escrow accounts, however, do not follow the 5/1 schedule; these are done annually.)
Fully Indexed Rate	The price of the ARM is calculated by adding Index + Margin = Fully Indexed Rate. This is the interest rate your loan would be at without a Start Rate (the introductory special rate for the initial fixed period). This means the loan would be higher if adjusting, typically, 1–3% higher than the fixed rate. Calculating this is important for ARM buyers, since it helps predict the future interest rate of the loan.
Margin	For ARMs where the index is applied to the interest rate of the note on an "index plus margin" basis, the margin is the difference between the note rate and the index on which the note rate is based expressed in percentage terms. This is not to be confused with profit margin. The lower the margin the better the loan is to the borrower as the maximum rate will increase less at each adjustment. Margins will vary between 2% and 7%.
Index	A published financial index such as LIBOR used to periodically adjust the interest rate of the ARM.
Start Rate	The introductory rate provided to purchasers of ARM loans for the initial fixed interest period.
Period	The length of time between interest rate adjustments. In times of falling interest rates, a shorter period benefits the borrower. On the other hand, in times of rising interest rates, a shorter period benefits the lender.
Floor	A clause that sets the minimum rate for the interest rate of an ARM loan. Loans may come with a Start Rate = Floor feature, but this is primarily for Non-Conforming (aka Sub-Prime or Program Lending) loan products. This prevents an ARM loan from ever adjusting lower than the Start Rate. An "A Paper" loan typically has either no Floor or 2% below start.
Payment Shock	Industry term to describe the severe (unexpected or planned for by borrower) upward movement of mortgage loan interest rates and its effect on borrowers. This is the major risk of an ARM, as this can lead to severe financial hardship for the borrower.
Cap	Any clause that sets a limitation on the amount or frequency of rate changes.

== Loan caps ==
Loan caps provide payment protection against payment shock, and allow a measure of interest rate certainty to those who gamble with initial fixed rates on ARM loans. There are three types of Caps on a typical First Lien Adjustable Rate Mortgage or First Lien Hybrid Adjustable Rate Mortgage.

Initial Adjustment Rate Cap: The majority of loans have a higher cap for initial adjustments that's indexed to the initial fixed period. In other words, the longer the initial fixed term, the more the bank would like to potentially adjust your loan. Typically, this cap is 2–3% above the Start Rate on a loan with an initial fixed rate term of three years or lower and 5–6% above the Start Rate on a loan with an initial fixed rate term of five years or greater.

Rate Adjustment Cap: This is the maximum amount by which an Adjustable Rate Mortgage may increase on each successive adjustment. Similar to the initial cap, this cap is usually 1% above the Start Rate for loans with an initial fixed term of three years or greater and usually 2% above the Start Rate for loans that have an initial fixed term of five years or greater.

Lifetime Cap: Most First Mortgage loans have a 5% or 6% Life Cap above the Start Rate (this ultimately varies by the lender and credit grade).

- Industry Shorthand for ARM Caps

Inside the business caps are expressed most often by simply the three numbers involved that signify each cap. For example, a 5/1 Hybrid ARM may have a cap structure of 5/2/5 (5% initial cap, 2% adjustment cap and 5% lifetime cap) and insiders would call this a 5-2-5 cap. Alternatively, a 1-year ARM might have a 1/1/6 cap (1% initial cap, 1% adjustment cap and 6% lifetime cap) known as a 1-1-6, or alternatively expressed as a 1/6 cap (leaving out one digit signifies that the initial and adjustment caps are identical).

- Negative amortization ARM caps

See the complete article for the type of ARM that Negative amortization loans are by nature. Higher risk products, such as First Lien Monthly Adjustable loans with Negative amortization and Home equity lines of credit (HELOCs) have different ways of structuring the Cap than a typical First Lien Mortgage. The typical First Lien Monthly Adjustable loans with Negative amortization loan has a life cap for the underlying rate (aka "Fully Indexed Rate") between 9.95% and 12% (maximum assessed interest rate). Some of these loans can have much higher rate ceilings. The fully indexed rate is always listed on the statement, but borrowers are shielded from the full effect of rate increases by the minimum payment, until the loan is recast, which is when principal and interest payments are due that will fully amortize the loan at the fully indexed rate.

- Home equity lines of credit (HELOCs)

Since HELOCs are intended by banks to primarily sit in second lien position, they normally are only capped by the maximum interest rate allowed by law in the state wherein they are issued. For example, Florida currently has an 18% cap on interest rate charges. They are risky to the borrower in the sense that they are mostly indexed to the Wall Street Journal prime rate, which is considered a Spot Index, or a financial indicator that is subject to immediate change (as are the loans based upon the Prime Rate). The risk to borrower being that a financial situation causing the Federal Reserve to raise rates dramatically (see 1980, 2006) would effect an immediate rise in obligation to the borrower, up to the capped rate.

== Popularity ==
Variable rate mortgages are the most common form of loan for house purchase in the United Kingdom, Ireland and Canada but are unpopular in some other countries such as Germany. Variable rate mortgages are very common in Australia and New Zealand. In some countries, true fixed-rate mortgages are not available except for shorter-term loans; in Canada, the longest term for which a mortgage rate can be fixed is typically no more than ten years, while mortgage maturities are commonly 25 years.

In many countries, it is not feasible for banks to lend at fixed rates for very long terms; in these cases, the only feasible type of mortgage for banks to offer may be adjustable rate mortgages (barring some form of government intervention). For example, the mortgage industry of the United Kingdom has traditionally been dominated by building societies. Since funds raised by UK building societies must be at least 50% deposits, lenders prefer variable-rate mortgages to fixed-rate mortgages to reduce potential interest rate risks between what they charging in mortgage interest and what they are paying in interest for deposits and other funding sources.

Countries where fixed rate loans are the common form of loan for a house purchase usually need to have a specific legal framework in place to make this possible. For example, in Germany and Austria the popular Bausparkassen, a type of mutual building societies, offer long-term fixed rate loans. They are legally separate from banks and require borrowers to save up a considerable amount, at a rather low fixed interest rate, before they get their loan; this is done by requiring the future borrower to begin paying in his fixed monthly payments well before actually getting the loan. It is generally not possible to pay this in as a lump sum and get the loan right away; it has to be done in monthly installments of the same size as what will be paid during the payback phase of the mortgage. Depending on whether there are enough savers in the system at any given time, payout of a loan may be delayed for some time even when the savings quota has already been met by the would-be borrower. The advantage for the borrower is that the monthly payment is guaranteed never to be increased, and the lifetime of the loan is also fixed in advance. The disadvantage is that this model, in which you have to start making payments several years before actually getting the loan, is mostly aimed at once-in-a-lifetime home buyers who are able to plan ahead for a long time. That has become a problem with the generally higher mobility that is demanded of workers nowadays.

For those who plan to move within a relatively short period of time (three to seven years), variable rate mortgages may still be attractive because they often include a lower, fixed rate of interest for the first three, five, or seven years of the loan, after which the interest rate fluctuates.

=== In Singapore ===
In Singapore, ARM is commonly known as floating rate or variable rate mortgage. Unlike fixed-rate mortgage in the country, a floating rate mortgage has its interest rate varying during the entire duration of the loan. The loans can be pegged to the bank board rate, SIBOR, or SOR

Typically, the structure of the interest rate of the mortgage is as follows:

Period	Interest Rate (p.a.)
First Year	0.75% + 1-Month SIBOR
Second Year	0.75% + 1-Month SIBOR
Third Year	1.00% + 1-Month SIBOR
Fourth Year Onwards	1.25% + 1-Month SIBOR

The loan can be pegged to SIBOR or SOR of any duration, and a spread (margin) is tacked to the X-month SIBOR/SOR. The spread is usually adjusted upwards after the first few years.

SIBOR-pegged ARMs are more popular than SOR-or board&rate-pegged mortgages.

However, recently, ANZ introduced an ARM that is pegged to the average of SIBOR and SOR. So far, it is the only bank in Singapore to offer such a mortgage.

== Pricing ==
Adjustable rate mortgages are typically, but not always, less expensive than fixed-rate mortgages. Due to the inherent interest rate risk, long-term fixed rates will tend to be higher than short-term rates (which are the basis for variable-rate loans and mortgages). The difference in interest rates between short and long-term loans is known as the yield curve, which generally slopes upward (longer terms are more expensive). The opposite circumstance is known as an inverted yield curve and is relatively infrequent.

The fact that an adjustable rate mortgage has a lower starting interest rate does not indicate what the future cost of borrowing will be (when rates change). If rates rise, the cost will be higher; if rates go down, cost will be lower. In effect, the borrower has agreed to take the interest rate risk.

The actual pricing and rate analysis of adjustable rate mortgage in the finance industry is done through various computer simulation methodologies like Monte Carlo method or Sobol sequences. In these techniques, by using an assumed probability distribution of future interest rates, numerous (10,000–100,000 or even 1,000,000) possible interest rate scenarios are explored, mortgage cash flows calculated under each, and aggregate parameters like fair value and effective interest rate over the life of the mortgage are estimated. Having these at hand, lending analysts determine whether offering a particular mortgage would be profitable, and if it would represent tolerable risk to the bank.

== Prepayment ==
Adjustable rate mortgages, like other types of mortgage, usually allow the borrower to prepay principal (or capital) early without penalty. Early payments of part of the principal will reduce the total cost of the loan (total interest paid), but will not shorten the amount of time needed to pay off the loan like other loan types. Upon each recasting, the new fully indexed interest rate is applied to the remaining principal to end within the remaining term schedule.

If a mortgage is refinanced, the borrower simultaneously takes out a new mortgage and pays off the old mortgage; the latter counts as a prepayment.

Some ARMs charge prepayment penalties of several thousand dollars if the borrower refinances the loan or pays it off early, especially within the first three or five years of the loan.

== Criticism ==
=== Predatory lending ===
Adjustable rate mortgages are sometimes sold to consumers who are unlikely to repay the loan should interest rates rise. In the United States, extreme cases are characterized by the Consumer Federation of America as predatory loans. Protections against interest rate rises include (a) a possible initial period with a fixed rate (which gives the borrower a chance to increase his/her annual earnings before payments rise); (b) a maximum (cap) that interest rates can rise in any year (if there is a cap, it must be specified in the loan document); and (c) a maximum (cap) that interest rates can rise over the life of the mortgage (this also must be specified in the loan document).

=== Interest rate errors and overcharges ===
In September 1991, the Government Accountability Office (GAO) released a study of Adjustable Rate Mortgages in the United States which found between 20% and 25% of the ARM loans out of the estimated 12 million at the time contained Interest Rate Errors. A former federal mortgage banking auditor estimated these mistakes created at least US$10 billion in net overcharges to American home-owners. Such errors occurred when the related mortgage servicer selected the incorrect index date, used an incorrect margin, or ignored interest rate change caps.

In July 1994, Consumer Loan Advocates, a non-profit mortgage auditing firm announced that as many as 18% of Adjustable Rate Mortgages have errors costing the borrower more than $5,000 in interest overcharges.

In December 1995, a government study concluded that 50–60% of all Adjustable Rate Mortgages in the United States contain an error regarding the variable interest rate charged to the homeowner. The study estimated the total amount of interest overcharged to borrowers was in excess of $8 billion. Inadequate computer programs, incorrect completion of documents and calculation errors were cited as the major causes of interest rate overcharges. No other government studies have been conducted into ARM interest overcharges.

=== Ireland’s Tracker Mortgage Scandal ===
In 2015, Ireland’s Central Bank recognised that the country had a problem with banks moving customers away from low interest, and unprofitable, tracker mortgages in an adverse manner, and setup an investigation into what had happened.

== History ==
On April 3, 1980, the Federal Home Loan Bank Board voted to authorize savings and loan associations to offer the renegotiable-rate mortgage (RRM) to mortgagors for home purchases, the first variable rate mortgage in the United States. Under the regulations, the interest rate could be changed every three years, and could rise no more than 5 percentage points over the original APR life of a 30-year mortgage, or be lowered without limit. The new rule was made in response to a decrease in new housing starts and purchases by buyers hesitant about a long-term commitment to the high interest rates at the time, and was a concept similar to the "rollover mortgage" that were already in use in Canada.

TITLE VIII, ALTERNATIVE MORTGAGE TRANSACTIONS, Garn–St. Germain Depository Institutions Act of 1982 allowed Adjustable rate mortgages.

In 2006, before the subprime mortgage crisis, over 90% of the subprime mortgages (which accounted for 20% of all mortgages) were adjustable-rate mortgages.

== See also ==
- Introductory rate
- Teaser rate
- VA loan
- United States housing bubble
- US mortgage terminology
