= Mortgage industry of the United Kingdom =

The mortgage industry of the United Kingdom was traditionally dominated by building societies, the first of which opened in Birmingham in 1775. But since the 1970s, the share of new mortgage loans market held by building societies has declined substantially. Between 1977 and 1987, the share fell drastically from 96% to 66%, and that of banks and other institutions rose from 3% to 36%. Major lenders include building societies, banks, specialized mortgage corporations, insurance companies and pension funds. During the four years after the 2008 financial crisis, the UK mutual sector provided approximately 80% of net lending to the housing market. There are currently more than 200 significant separate financial organizations supplying mortgage loans to home buyers in Britain, with Lloyds Bank and the Nationwide Building Society having the largest market share.

== Mortgage lenders ==
Over the years, the share of the new mortgage loans market held by building societies has declined. Between 1977 and 1987, it fell drastically from 96% to 66% while that of banks and other institutions rose from 3% to 36%. The banks and other institutions that made major inroads into the mortgage market during this period were helped by such factors as:

- relative managerial efficiency;
- advanced technology, organizational capabilities, and expertise in marketing;
- extensive branch networks; and
- capacities to tap cheaper international sources of funds for lending.

By the early 1990s, UK building societies had succeeded in greatly slowing if not reversing the decline in their market share. In 1990, the societies held over 60% of all mortgage loans but took over 75% of the new mortgage market – mainly at the expense of specialized mortgage loans corporations. Building societies also increased their share of the personal savings deposits market in the early 1990s at the expense of the banks – attracting 51% of this market in 1990 compared with 42% in 1989. One study found that in the five years 1987-1992, the building societies collectively outperformed the UK clearing banks on practically all the major growth and performance measures. The societies' share of the new mortgage loans market of 75% in 1990-91 was similar to the share level achieved in 1985. Profitability as measured by return on capital was 17.8% for the top 20 societies in 1991, compared with only 8.5% for the big four banks. Finally, bad debt provisions relative to advances were only 0.4% for the top 20 societies compared with 2.8% for the four banks.

Though the building societies did subsequently recover a significant amount of the mortgage lending business lost to the banks, they still only had about two-thirds of the total market at the end of the 1980s. However, banks and building societies were by now becoming increasingly similar in terms of their structures and functions. When the Abbey National building society converted into a bank in 1989, this could be regarded either as a major diversification of a building society into retail banking – or as significantly increasing the presence of banks in the residential mortgage loans market. Research organization Industrial Systems Research has observed that trends towards the increased integration of the financial services sector have made comparison and analysis of the market shares of different types of institution increasingly problematical. It identifies as major factors making for consistently higher levels of growth and performance on the part of some mortgage lenders in the UK over the years:

- the introduction of new technologies, mergers, structural reorganization and economies of scale, and generally increased efficiency in production and marketing operations insofar as these enable lenders to reduce their costs and offer more price-competitive and innovative loans and savings products;
- The UK mortgage market is supported by a network of specialized intermediaries and appointed representatives, such as Ample Mortgages, which operate under the regulation of the Financial Conduct Authority.
- buoyant retail savings receipts, and reduced reliance on relatively expensive wholesale markets for funds (especially when interest rates generally are being maintained at high levels internationally);
- lower levels of arrears, possessions, bad debts, and provisioning than competitors;
- increased flexibility and earnings from secondary sources and activities as a result of political-legal deregulation; and
- being specialized or concentrating on traditional core, relatively profitable mortgage lending and savings deposit operations.

== Mortgage types ==
The UK mortgage market is one of the most innovative and competitive in the world. There is little intervention in the market by the state or state funded entities and virtually all borrowing is funded by either mutual organisations (building societies and credit unions) or proprietary lenders (typically banks). Since 1982, when the market was substantially deregulated, there has been substantial innovation and diversification of strategies employed by lenders to attract borrowers. This has led to a wide range of mortgage types.

As lenders derive their funds either from the money markets or from deposits, most mortgages revert to a variable rate, either the lender's standard variable rate or a tracker rate, which will tend to be linked to the underlying Bank of England (BoE) repo rate (or sometimes LIBOR). Initially they will tend to offer an incentive deal to attract new borrowers. This may be:

- A fixed rate; where the interest rate remains constant for a set period; typically for 2, 3, 4, 5 or 10 years. Longer term fixed rates (over 5 years) whilst available, tend to be more expensive and/or have more onerous early repayment charges and are therefore less popular than shorter term fixed rates.
- A capped rate; where similar to a fixed rate, the interest rate cannot rise above the cap but can vary beneath the cap. Sometimes there is a collar associated with this type of rate which imposes a minimum rate. Capped rate are often offered over periods similar to fixed rates, e.g. 2, 3, 4 or 5 years.
- A discount rate; where there is set margin reduction in the standard variable rate (e.g. a 2% discount) for a set period; typically 1 to 5 years. Sometimes the discount is expressed as a margin over the base rate (e.g. BoE base rate plus 0.5% for 2 years) and sometimes the rate is stepped (e.g. 3% in year 1, 2% in year 2, 1% in year three).
- A cashback mortgage; where a lump sum is provided (typically) as a percentage of the advance e.g. 5% of the loan.

These rates are sometimes combined: For example, 4.5% 2 year fixed then a 3-year tracker at BoE rate plus 0.89%.

With each incentive the lender may be offering a rate at less than the market cost of the borrowing. Therefore, they typically impose a penalty if the borrower repays the loan within the incentive period or a longer period (referred to as an extended tie-in). These penalties used to be called a redemption penalty or tie-in, however since the onset of Financial Services Authority regulation they are referred to as an early repayment charge.

=== Self-certification ===
These types of mortgages were banned from April 2014 for UK lenders. Although they haven't been banned completely by the UK regulator as they are available from European lenders.

Self-certification mortgages, informally known as "self cert" mortgages, were available to employed and self-employed people who have a deposit to buy a house but lack sufficient documentation to prove their income.

This type of mortgage was typically used by people whose income came from multiple sources, whose salary consisted largely or exclusively of commissions or bonuses, or whose accounts did not show a true reflection of their earnings. Accounts not showing a true reflection of earnings could have been due to undeclared (typically cash) income, for example, tips paid to those working in the hospitality industry or taxi drivers receiving cash payments. Self-employed people exaggerating expenses to lower taxable income created another group of applicants for self-certification mortgages.

These mortgages had two disadvantages: the interest rates charged were usually higher than for normal mortgages and the loan to value ratio was usually lower.

Since their abolition, there has been a common misconception that self-employed mortgages are now unobtainable. Whilst it's true the restrictions placed have left many creditworthy self-employed borrowers unable to finance, it has created niche markets for newly self-employed or borrowers who chose not to draw all their profits, that are now occupied by numerous specialist lenders.

=== 100% mortgages ===
When a bank lends money to a customer, they want to minimize the risk of not getting the money back. They manage the risk through their lending criteria, carrying out checks on the applicant and the property and also by asking the borrower to fund a certain percentage of the property purchase in the form of a deposit.

The higher the deposit, the lower the mortgage amount, so lower the risk of not being able to recover the loan when selling the property in case of a repossession.

100% mortgages are mortgages that require no deposit (100% loan to value). Examples include:

- some first-time buyer deals, when perhaps a portion of the loan is secured against a parent's property;
- concessionary purchase (inter-family property transaction), when the purchase is at below market value;
- Right to Buy purchase at a discounted purchase price;
- Shared Ownership purchase

100% mortgages normally offer higher interest rates than deals with even just 5-10% deposit.

=== Together/Plus mortgages ===
A development of the theme of 100% mortgages was represented by Together/Plus type mortgages, which stopped after the 2008 financial crisis.

Together/Plus Mortgages represented loans of 100% or more of the property value - typically up to a maximum of 125%. Such loans were normally (but not universally) structured as a package of a 95% mortgage and an unsecured loan of up to 30% of the property value. This structure was mandated by lenders' capital requirements which required additional capital for loans of 100% or more of the property value.

The mortgage part was typically on an interest only basis, while the unsecured loan was on a repayment basis. This meant that when making monthly payments, only the balance for the unsecured part would reduce. This arrangement often resulted in the borrowers becoming "mortgage prisoners" after the lenders stopped operating (for example Northern Rock), property prices were not rising and the customers were (or still are) unable to remortgage (due to the high loan to value) or sell their property. If they sold the property, the sale price would not cover the mortgage and the unsecured loan, so they would be left without a home and still carry some debt.

=== Contractor Mortgages ===
Contractor mortgages were developed for two specific types of independent contractors. First, contractors in the UK who incorporate a limited company to use as a payment structure. Second, contractors who likewise operate through a Ltd company payment structure, but do so via PAYE Umbrella companies.

The underwriting criteria that banks and building societies use for this type of mortgage loan is "contract-based underwriting". This is expressly different from traditional PAYE "employee", or even self-employed, affordability criteria.

These are still ′prime rate′ mortgages and normally available via any broker, although some brokers may not have enough knowledge or experience to source the most suitable deal for the customer. In comparison, if a contractor customer goes directly to a lender who offers contract rate based underwriting, the lender's advisor often insists on assessing income based on Ltd company accounts.

The demand for contractor-specific mortgages has risen since the credit crunch. Since 2015, mortgage lenders have added contractor mortgages to their offering at unprecedented levels to accommodate the surging gig economy in the UK.

== UK mortgage process ==
Arrangement fees and survey fees are components of the cost of moving house in the United Kingdom.

Typically, would-be borrowers approach a building society or bank for a single range of products, or use an intermediary (mortgage broker) for access to a select panel of lenders, or the whole market. The first stage is to complete a full fact find. The advisor will then search for the right deal for the customer, and then proceed to get an agreement in principle from the lender. Although an indication of lending approval, this is not set in stone until the mortgage is formally offered, post valuation of the property and assessment of the necessary supporting documents.

=== Arrangement fees ===
UK lenders usually charge a fee for setting up the mortgage. This can be anywhere from free to £1500

=== Valuation Fee ===
The arrangement fee will be followed by a valuation fee, which pays for a chartered surveyor to visit the property and ensure it is worth enough to cover the mortgage amount. This is not a full survey so it may not identify all the defects that a house buyer needs to know about.

It does not usually form a contract between the surveyor and the buyer, so the buyer has no right to sue in contract if the survey fails to detect a major problem. However, the buyer may have a remedy against the surveyor in tort.

=== Survey Fee ===
For an extra fee, the surveyor can usually carry out a building survey or a (cheaper) "homebuyers survey" at the same time.

== International comparisons ==
In the UK, fixed-rate mortgage options are as common as in the United States. Home ownership rates are comparable to the United States, but overall default rates are lower. In the UK, mortgage loan financing relies less on securitized assets (such as mortgage-backed securities) than the United States, Denmark, and Germany, and more on deposits like Australia and Spain, since funds raised by building societies must be at least 50% deposits. Lenders would prefer variable-rate mortgages to fixed-rate mortgages to reduce potential interest rate risks between what they charging in mortgage interest and what they are paying in interest for deposits and other funding sources, but borrowers usually prefer payment stability, even if for a short term of 2 years. Prepayment penalties (Early Repayment Charges - ERC) are still common, whilst the United States has discouraged their use. Like other European countries, and the rest of the world, but unlike most of the United States, mortgage loans are usually recourse debt: debtors are liable for any loan deficiencies after foreclosure (or "repossession" in the UK).

== See also ==
- Mortgage industry of Russia

== See also ==
- UK mortgage terminology
- English land law
- Housing in the United Kingdom
