= Introductory rate =

Introductory interest rate for a loan

An introductory rate (also known as a teaser rate) is an interest rate charged to a customer during the initial stages of a loan. The rate, which can be as low as 0%, is not permanent and after it expires a higher rate will apply.

The purpose of the introductory rate is to market the loan to customers and to seem attractive. They are commonly used for the application of balance transfers, and they may or may not apply to cash advances.

In the United States, the Fair Credit and Charge Card Disclosure Act (FCCCDA) requires that the rate that will occur following the expiration of the introductory rate be clearly disclosed to the customer.

== When determining qualification for a loan ==
Sometimes, due to an introductory rate, an applicant can get approved for a mortgage based on payment history, when that applicant may have had a good payment history on the introductory rate, but may not be able to maintain such payments once this rate expires and rises.

== Teaser rate ==
A teaser rate is a low, adjustable introductory interest rate advertised for a loan, credit card, or deposit account in order to attract potential customers to obtain the service. The teaser rates are normally too good to be true for the long term, and are far below the common realistic rate for the service. In a competitive market, many companies will compete with each other for the lower teaser rate. Typically, the teaser rate is 0%.

The teaser rate is only temporary. After its expiration, the rate increases and in some cases, the borrower cannot keep up with making payments at the higher post-teaser rate.

Some consumers with good credit manage to take advantage of teaser rates by applying for a card, having their balances transferred to that card, and then maintaining payments on that card during the period of the teaser rate. Prior to its expiration, they obtain another card that they use for the same. They continue this technique continually in an attempt to keep money borrowed at low interest rates. Many credit card issuers who catch onto a consumer using this technique will be reluctant to offer the teaser rate to such consumers.

== See also ==
- Adjustable-rate mortgage
- Trojan horse (business)
- US mortgage terminology
