= SAIBOR =

Reference rate in Saudi Arabia

The Saudi Arabian Interbank Offered Rate (SAIBOR) is a daily reference rate, published by the Saudi Central Bank (SCB or SAMA), based on the averaged interest rates at which Saudi banks offer to lend unsecured funds to other banks in the Saudi Riyal wholesale money market (or interbank market).

On 20 November 2016 Thomson Reuters was approved as the SAIBOR administrator and calculation agent by SAMA.

== Scope ==
SAIBOR is the key interbank rate in Saudi Arabia, and the benchmark for commercial and consumer lending rates.

It is also known as SIBOR, Saudi Interbank Offered Rate, but can be confused with SIBOR, Singapore Interbank Offered Rate.

== Calculation and tenors ==
Fixing is conducted each business day at 11 AM KSA time. The fixing rate is the average of the contributions excluding the two highest and two lowest contributions for each tenor.

As of 20 November 2016 the following tenors are calculated:

- Overnight
- 1 Week
- 1 Month
- 3 Months
- 6 Months
- 12 Months

Previously the 2 Month and 9 Month tenors were calculated but have since been discontinued.

== Contributor banks ==
As of 20 November 2016 the following banks contribute to SAIBOR:

- Arab National Bank
- Bank Aljazira
- Banque Saudi Fransi
- AL-AWAL Bank
- Emirates NBD
- Gulf International Bank
- National Bank of Kuwait
- Saudi National Bank
- Riyad Bank
- Saudi British Bank
- Saudi Investment Bank
- Alinma Bank
- Bank Albilad
