= SIBOR =

SIBOR stands for Singapore Interbank Offered Rate and is a daily reference rate based on the interest rates at which banks offer to lend unsecured funds to other banks in the Singapore wholesale money market (or interbank market). It is similar to the widely used LIBOR (London Interbank Offered Rate), and Euribor (Euro Interbank Offered Rate). Using SIBOR is more common in the Asian region and set by the Association of Banks in Singapore (ABS).

SIBOR comes in 1-, 3-, 6-, or 12-month tenure. At the end of the tenure, the borrowing bank returns the borrowed fund to the lending bank. The 3-month SIBOR is the most popular rate that loans are pegged to and has been hovering below around 1% in the past few years.

Many floating rate mortgages in the country are pegged to SIBOR due to its transparency. Alternatives to SIBOR include SOR, Fixed-rate mortgages, Combos (Combination of SIBOR and SOR). Although they may be higher or lower than SIBOR at any point of time, they usually move in tandem with the direction of SIBOR and are used by banks to help price loans.

SIBOR is being discontinued, with the 6-month SIBOR rate being discontinued with effect from 31 March 2022, and the rest of SIBOR to be discontinued with effect from 31 December 2024. SIBOR will be functionally replaced by SORA (Singapore Overnight Rate Average).

== See also ==
- Adjustable-rate mortgage
- Fixed-rate mortgage
- Singapore Swap Offer Rate (SOR)
- Euribor
- TIBOR
- Prime rate
- TED spread
- LIBOR-OIS spread
- LIBOR
- HIBOR
- SAIBOR
