= Mortgage industry of Russia =

Industry in Russia

Mortgage industry in Russia is a vital component of the financial market in the country. The most common use of a mortgage in Russia is for an individual to purchase an apartment on credit. Typically, the property being purchased serves as collateral, although an existing property already owned by the borrower can also be used as collateral. Any interested party may request an extract from the State Register of Rights to Real Estate and Transactions Therewith. If the property is mortgaged, this extract will explicitly state that an encumbrance—a lien—exists. In Russia, no more than one hundred banks are actively involved in the mortgage market. The modern form of mortgage lending in Russia emerged in the late 1990s and is governed by Federal Law No. 102-FZ, "On Mortgages (Real Estate Liens)".

== History ==
In 1944 the Council of People's Commissars of the USSR, via Decree No. 625 dated May 29, 1944, titled "On Measures for the Restoration of Individual Housing Stock in Liberated Areas and the Promotion of Individual Housing Construction in Cities and Workers' Settlements of the USSR", outlined a list of measures and procedures enabling the purchase and restoration of individual housing through credit. An annex to Tsekombank (Central Municipal Bank) Circular No. 60/25, dated June 6, 1944, established a standard loan agreement form between a municipal bank and a borrower. This document included a repayment schedule for the outstanding balance (plus interest) and a fixed penalty rate for late payments on the principal loan. In 1946 a decree by the Council of Ministers of the Soviet Union, dated August 25, 1946, titled "On Increasing Wages and Constructing Housing for Workers, Engineers, and Technical Staff at Enterprises and Construction Sites in the Urals, Siberia, and the Far East", specified standard loan amounts, interest rates, repayment terms, and the number of houses to be made available for purchase. It mandated that the Ministry of Finance allocate up to 1 billion rubles for the provision of loans to workers, engineers, technical staff, and other employees. By 1985, individual and cooperative housing construction accounted for 55% of the total outstanding debt across all major categories of consumer credit. Payment structure for housing construction cooperatives (ZhSK): a 40% down payment, a 15-year installment plan, and a 2.7% interest rate. Construction of a private home: interest rates ranging from 1% to 2.7%, with loan repayment deferred until the third year after the loan was taken out. Loans for home improvements were offered at an annual interest rate of 2.5%. It was also possible to obtain a loan for the renovation of a vacant house.

In 1992 the Law "On Collateral" (Pledge) was adopted. In 1994 a decree was issued by the president of Russia, Boris Yeltsin, "On the Development and Implementation of Off-Budget Forms of Investment in Housing Construction", which led to the establishment of local off-budget funds in various regions. In 1997 at the initiative of Russian deputies and U.S. congressmen, a commission on the development of mortgage lending in Russia was established within the State Duma. The "Agency for Housing Mortgage Lending" (AHML)—an open joint-stock company—was created pursuant to a resolution of the Government of the Russian Federation (dated August 26, 1996, No. 1010) to carry out the task of building and developing a mortgage housing lending system in Russia, as part of the federal targeted program "My Home" ("Svoy Dom"). In 1998 the Law "On Mortgages" was adopted. In 2000 at the initiative of State Duma deputies and mortgage market operators, the International Association of Housing Construction and Mortgage Lending Funds was established. The primary objective of MAIF is to facilitate interaction with authorities at all levels, enabling its members to participate in the formulation and implementation of state policy regarding the development of an affordable housing market. In 2002–2003 the formation of a two-tier mortgage market model. At the first level are commercial banks that issue mortgage loans to individuals. At the second level is the Agency for Housing Mortgage Lending, which purchases the mortgages for these loans from the banks, thereby serving the function of refinancing the system. In 2010 the "Strategy for the Development of Mortgage Housing Lending in the Russian Federation up to 2030" was approved.

The volume of mortgage loans issued in 2016 exceeded the 2015 figure by 27%, reaching 1.47 trillion rubles. The mortgage loan portfolio showed steady growth throughout 2016, reaching 4.49 trillion rubles by the end of the year. These strong results were driven by interest rate cuts implemented by major banks. By the end of 2017, the volume of new mortgage lending was projected to reach 1.6 trillion rubles, with the total portfolio growing to 5 trillion rubles.

On February 19, 2019, the State Duma passed a law to ease the burden on mortgage borrowers. Under previous rules, in the event of a default on mortgage payments, each joint debtor was required to pay a 7% enforcement fee—in addition to the outstanding debt and interest. Under the new legislation, this 7% enforcement fee is applied to all joint debtors collectively.

On April 18, 2019, the State Duma passed a bill on "mortgage holidays" in its third reading. The bill was approved by the Federation Council on April 22, and on May 1, it was signed into law by the head of state as Federal Law No. 76-FZ, titled "On Amendments to Certain Legislative Acts of the Russian Federation Regarding Specifics for Modifying the Terms of Credit or Loan Agreements Concluded with Individual Borrowers for Non-Business Purposes, Where Such Obligations Are Secured by a Mortgage, at the Borrower's Request." The law enters into force on July 31, 2019. In January 2020, the Central Bank recorded an average interest rate of 8.84% per annum on newly issued mortgages.

In the spring of 2020, a subsidized mortgage program with an interest rate of 6.5% was approved for buyers of new residential properties. Although the program was initially scheduled to end on November 1, 2020, the authorities subsequently extended it until July 1, 2021.

In mid-December 2022, Russian president Vladimir Putin announced the extension of the subsidized mortgage program, which had been set to expire on December 31. The program is now being gradually phased out. According to the president, the subsidized mortgage scheme will be extended across the entire Russian Federation for another 18 months—until July 1, 2024—with the interest rate increasing to 8%. Furthermore, the program’s eligibility has been expanded to include families with two children under the age of 18.

According to Russian deputy prime minister, Marat Khusnullin, the growth of the mortgage portfolio in 2023 exceeded 3.5 trillion rubles, compared to 2 trillion rubles in 2022. The primary investors are the country’s households.

In January 2024, Russian banks were granted an additional 2.3 trillion rubles in funding limits for state-backed mortgage programs. The primary recipients included Sberbank, VTB, Alfa-Bank, and Dom.RF. The limit for the "family mortgage" program was increased by 1.2 trillion rubles—reaching a total of 4.6 trillion—while the limit for the subsidized mortgage program for new housing was raised by 1 trillion rubles, bringing it to 6 trillion. In July 2024, the Russian Ministry of Finance announced the extension of the "family mortgage" program until 2030. It will be available to all families with at least one child under the age of six. The maximum loan amount will be 12 million rubles for Moscow, the Moscow Oblast, St. Petersburg and the Leningrad Oblast, and 6 million rubles for other regions.

== See also ==
- Mortgage industry of the United Kingdom
- Mortgage industry of the United States
