= Fixed-rate mortgage =

Mortgage loan repaid in equal installments

A fixed-rate mortgage (FRM) is a mortgage loan where the interest rate on the note remains the same through the term of the loan, as opposed to loans where the interest rate may adjust or "float". As a result, payment amounts and the duration of the loan are fixed and the person who is responsible for paying back the loan benefits from a consistent, single payment and the ability to plan a budget based on this fixed cost.

Other forms of mortgage loans include interest only mortgage, graduated payment mortgage, variable rate mortgage (including adjustable-rate mortgages and tracker mortgages), negative amortization mortgage, and balloon payment mortgage. Unlike many other loan types, FRM interest payments and loan duration is fixed from beginning to end.

Fixed-rate mortgages are characterized by amount of loan, interest rate, compounding frequency, and duration. With these values, the monthly repayments can be calculated.

Fixed-rate mortgages are vulnerable to inflation risk, which means that borrowers with such mortgages are better off under unexpectedly high inflation (as the inflation lowers the real present value of their loan repayments), while they are worse off if there is a drop in inflation that lowers interest rates. Fixed-rate mortgages usually charge higher interest rates than those with adjustable rates. According to scholars, "borrowers should generally prefer adjustable-rate over fixed-rate mortgages, unless interest rates are low."

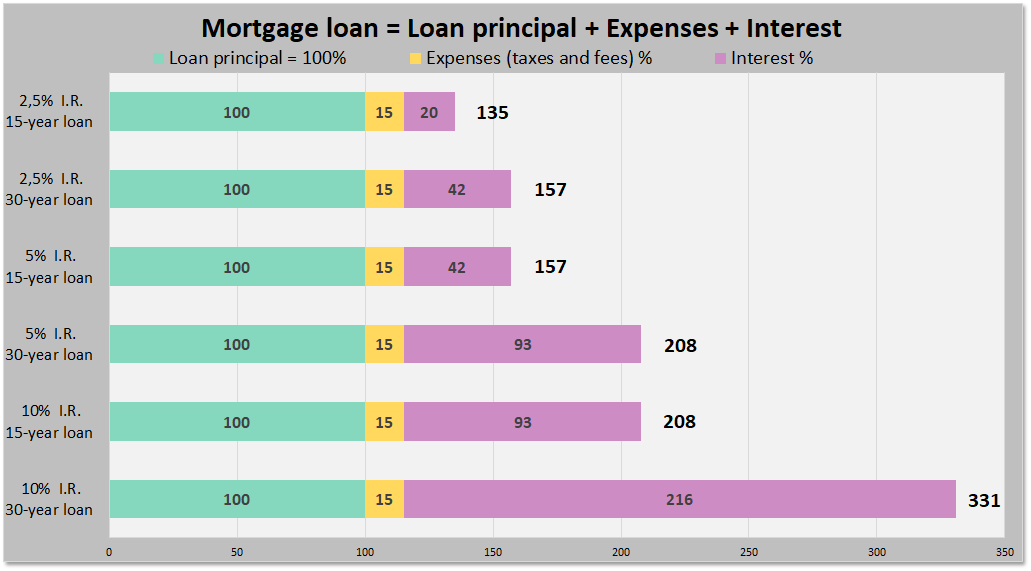
Mortgage Loan. Total Payment (3 Fixed Interest Rates & 2 Loan Term) = Loan Principal + Expenses (Taxes & fees) + Total interest to be paid. The final cost will be exactly the same: * when the interest rate is 2.5% and the term is 30 years than when the interest rate is 5% and the term is 15 years * when the interest rate is 5% and the term is 30 years than when the interest rate is 10% and the term is 15 years

== Usage throughout the world ==
The availability of fixed-rate mortgages varies between countries.

In the United States, the Federal Housing Administration (FHA) helped develop and standardize the fixed rate mortgage as an alternative to the balloon payment mortgage by insuring them and by doing so helped the mortgage design garner usage. Because of the large payment at the end of the older, balloon-payment loan, refinancing risk resulted in widespread foreclosures. The fixed-rate mortgage was the first mortgage loan that was fully amortized (fully paid at the end of the loan) precluding successive loans, and had fixed interest rates and payments. Fixed-rate mortgages are the most classic form of loan for home and product purchasing in the United States. The most common terms are 15-year and 30-year mortgages, but shorter terms are available, and 40-year and 50-year mortgages are now available (common in areas with high housing costs, where even a 30-year term leaves the monthly payments out of reach of the average family).

In Canada, the longest term for which a mortgage rate can be fixed is typically no more than ten years, while mortgage maturities are commonly 25 years. In Denmark, fixed-rate 30-year mortgages are the standard form of home loan. A fixed rate mortgage in Singapore has the interest rate fixed for only the first three to five years of the loan, and it then becomes variable. In Australia, "honeymoon" mortgages with introductory rates are common, but can last as short as a year, and may instead offer a fixed reduction in interest rate rather than a fixed rate itself. Furthermore, they are often combined with properties of flexible mortgages to create what is known as an Australian mortgage, which often allow borrowers to overpay to reduce interest charges and then draw on these overpayments in the future.

In the UK, fixed-rate mortgage is the name given to an adjustable-rate mortgage with the interest rate locked in for the first two to five years. At the end of that time, many borrowers refinance their mortgages to lock in another stable rate for the next few years. The mortgage industry of the United Kingdom has traditionally been dominated by building societies, whose raised funds must be at least 50% deposits, so lenders prefer variable-rate mortgages to fixed-rate mortgages, to reduce asset–liability mismatch due to interest rate risk. Lenders, in turn, influence consumer decisions which already prefer lower initial monthly payments.

== Comparisons ==
Fixed-rate mortgages are usually more expensive than adjustable rate mortgages. The inherent interest rate risk makes long-term fixed rate loans tend to have a higher interest rate than short-term loans. The relationship between interest rates for short and long-term loans is represented by the yield curve, which generally slopes upward (longer terms are more expensive). The opposite circumstance is known as an inverted yield curve and occurs less often.

The fact that a fixed-rate mortgage has a higher starting interest rate does not indicate that it is a worse type of borrowing than an adjustable-rate mortgage. If interest rates rise, the ARM will cost more, but the FRM will cost the same. In effect, the lender has agreed to take the interest rate risk on a fixed-rate loan.

Some studies have shown that the majority of borrowers with adjustable rate mortgages save money in the long term but also that some borrowers pay more. The price of potentially saving money, in other words, is balanced by the risk of potentially higher costs. In each case, a choice would need to be made based upon the loan term, the current interest rate, and the likelihood that the rate will increase or decrease during the life of the loan.

== Pricing ==
- Note: Fixed-rate mortgage interest may be compounded differently in other countries, such as in Canada, where it is compounded every 6 months.

The fixed monthly payment for a fixed rate mortgage is the amount paid by the borrower every month that ensures that the loan is paid off in full with interest at the end of its term. This monthly payment $c$ depends upon the monthly interest rate $r$ (expressed as a fraction, not a percentage, i.e., divide the quoted yearly nominal percentage rate by 100 and by 12 to obtain the monthly interest rate), the number of monthly payments $N$ called the loan's term, and the amount borrowed $P_0$ known as the loan's principal; rearranging the formula for the present value of an ordinary annuity we get the formula for $c$:

$$c = {r\over{1-(1+r)^{-N}}}P_0$$

For example, for a home loan for $200,000 with a fixed yearly nominal interest rate of 6.5% for 30 years, the principal is $P_0=200000$, the monthly interest rate is $r=6.5/100/12$, the number of monthly payments is $N=30\cdot 12=360$, the fixed monthly payment $c=\$1264.14$. This formula is provided using the financial function PMT in a spreadsheet such as Excel. In the example, the monthly payment is obtained by entering either of these formulas:

=PMT(6.5/100/12,30*12,200000)
=((6.5/100/12)/(1-(1+6.5/100/12)^(-30*12)))*200000
$${}=1264.14$$

This monthly payment formula is easy to derive, and the derivation illustrates how fixed-rate mortgage loans work. The amount owed on the loan at the end of every month equals the amount owed from the previous month, plus the interest on this amount, minus the fixed amount paid every month.

Amount owed at month 0:

$$P_0$$

Amount owed at month 1:

$P_1 = P_0+P_0*r-c$ ( principal + interest – payment)
$P_1 = P_0(1+r)-c$ (equation 1)

Amount owed at month 2:

$$P_2 = P_1(1+r)-c$$
Using equation 1 for $P_1$
$$P_2 = (P_0(1+r)-c)(1+r)-c$$
$P_2 = P_0(1+r)^2- c(1+r)- c$ (equation 2)

Amount owed at month 3:

$$P_3 = P_2(1+r) - c$$
Using equation 2 for $P_2$
$$P_3 = (P_0(1+r)^2- c(1+r)- c)(1+r) - c$$
$$P_3 = P_0(1+r)^3- c(1+r)^2- c(1+r) - c$$

Amount owed at month N:

$$P_N = P_{N-1}(1+r) - c$$
$$P_N = P_0(1+r)^N - c(1+r)^{N-1} - c(1+r)^{N-2} .... - c$$
$$P_N = P_0(1+r)^N - c ((1+r)^{N-1} + (1+r)^{N-2} .... + 1)$$
$P_N = P_0(1+r)^N - c (S)$ (equation 3)
Where $S = (1+r)^{N-1} + (1+r)^{N-2} .... + 1$ (equation 4) (see geometric progression)
$S(1+r) = (1+r)^N + (1+r)^{N-1} .... + (1+r)$ (equation 5)

With the exception of two terms the $S$ and $S(1+r)$ series are the same so when you subtract all but two terms cancel:

Using equation 4 and 5
$$S(1+r)-S = (1+r)^N - 1$$
$$S((1+r)-1) = (1+r)^N - 1$$
$$S(r) = (1+r)^N - 1$$
$S = {{(1+r)^N - 1}\over r}$ (equation 6)

Putting equation 6 back into 3:

$$P_N = P_0(1+r)^N - c {{(1+r)^N - 1}\over r}$$

$P_N$ will be zero because we have paid the loan off.

$$0 = P_0(1+r)^N - c {{(1+r)^N - 1}\over r}$$

We want to know $c$

$$c = {{r(1+r)^N} \over {(1+r)^N-1}} P_0$$

Divide top and bottom with $(1+r)^N$

$$c = {r \over {1-(1+r)^{-N}}} P_0$$

This derivation illustrates three key components of fixed-rate loans: (1) the fixed monthly payment depends upon the amount borrowed, the interest rate, and the length of time over which the loan is repaid; (2) the amount owed every month equals the amount owed from the previous month plus interest on that amount, minus the fixed monthly payment; (3) the fixed monthly payment is chosen so that the loan is paid off in full with interest at the end of its term and no more money is owed.

The vendor may sell off the fix element as a "fixed to floating" derivative, see Black-Scholes model.

== See also ==
- Adjustable-rate mortgage
- Singapore Swap Offer Rate
- SIBOR
- VA loan
- FHA loan
