= Interbank lending market =

Short-term lending market for banks

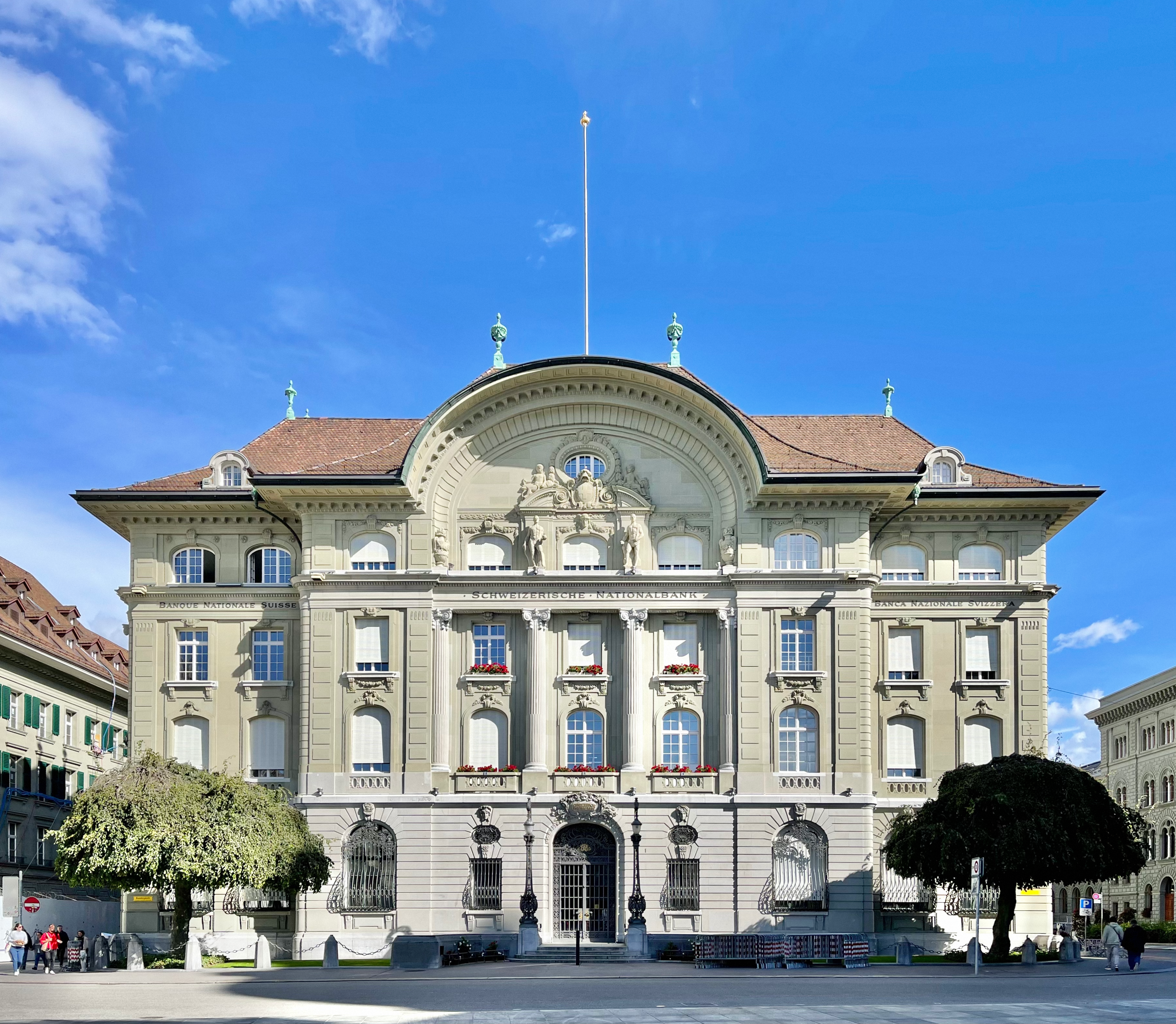
Swiss National Bank in Bern, Switzerland

The interbank lending market is a market in which banks lend funds to one another for a specified term. Most interbank loans are for maturities of one week or less, the majority being overnight. Such loans are made at the interbank rate (also called the overnight rate if the term of the loan is overnight). A sharp decline in transaction volume in this market was a major contributing factor to the collapse of several financial institutions during the 2008 financial crisis.

Banks are typically required to hold reserves of an adequate amount of liquid assets, such as cash, to manage any potential bank runs by customers. To remain compliant, those banks with less than the required liquidity will borrow money and pay interest in the interbank market, while those with excess liquid assets will lend money and receive interest.

The interbank rate is the rate of interest charged on short-term loans between banks. Banks borrow and lend money in the interbank lending market in order to manage liquidity and satisfy regulations such as reserve requirements. The interest rate charged depends on the availability of money in the market, on prevailing rates and on the specific terms of the contract, such as term length. There is a wide range of published interbank rates, including the federal funds rate (US), the LIBOR (UK) and the Euribor (Eurozone).

== Interbank segment of the money market ==
The interbank lending market refers to the subset of bank-to-bank transactions that take place in the money market.

Banks are key players in several segments of the money market. To meet reserve requirements and manage day-to-day liquidity needs, banks buy and sell short-term uncollateralized loans in the federal funds market. For longer-maturity loans, banks can tap the Eurodollar market. Eurodollars are dollar-denominated deposit liabilities of banks located outside the United States (or of International Banking Facilities in the United States). US banks can raise funds in the Eurodollar market through their overseas branches and subsidiaries. A second option is to issue large negotiable certificates of deposit (CDs). These are certificates issued by banks which state that a specified amount of money has been deposited for a period of time and will be redeemed with interest at maturity. Repurchase agreements (repos) are yet another source of funding. Repos and reverse repos are transactions in which a borrower agrees to sell securities to a lender and then to repurchase the same or similar securities after a specified time, at a given price, and including interest at an agreed-upon rate. Repos are collateralized or secured loans in contrast to federal funds loans which are unsecured.

== Role of interbank lending in the financial system ==
=== To support the fractional reserve banking model ===
The creation of credit and transfer of the created funds to another bank, creates the need for the 'net-lender' bank to borrow to cover requirements for short-term withdrawals by depositors. This results from the fact that the initially created funds have been transferred to another bank. If there was (conceptually) only one commercial bank then all the new credit (money) created would be redeposited in that bank (or held as physical cash outside it) and the requirement for interbank lending for this purpose would reduce. (In a fractional reserve banking model it would still be required to address the issue of a 'run' on the bank concerned.)

=== A source of funds for banks ===
Interbank loans are important for a well-functioning and efficient banking system. Since banks are subject to regulations such as reserve requirements, they may face liquidity shortages at the end of the day. The interbank market allows banks to smooth through such temporary liquidity shortages and reduce 'funding liquidity risk'.

==== Funding liquidity risk ====
Funding liquidity risk captures the inability of a financial intermediary to service its liabilities as they fall due. This type of risk is particularly relevant for banks since their business model involves funding long-term loans through short-term deposits and other liabilities. The healthy functioning of interbank lending markets can help reduce funding liquidity risk because banks can obtain loans in this market quickly and at little cost. When interbank markets are dysfunctional or strained, banks face a greater funding liquidity risk which in extreme cases can result in insolvency.

==== Longer-term trends in banks' sources of funds ====
In the past, checkable deposits were US banks’ most important source of funds; in 1960, checkable deposits comprised more than 60 percent of banks’ total liabilities. Over time, however, the composition of banks’ balance sheets has changed significantly. In lieu of customer deposits, banks have increasingly turned to short-term liabilities such as commercial paper (CP), certificates of deposit (CDs), repurchase agreements (repos), swapped foreign exchange liabilities, and brokered deposits.

=== Benchmarks for short-term lending rates ===
Interest rates in the unsecured interbank lending market serve as reference rates in the pricing of numerous financial instruments such as floating rate notes (FRNs), adjustable-rate mortgages (ARMs), and syndicated loans. These benchmark rates are also commonly used in corporate cashflow analysis as discount rates. Thus, conditions in the unsecured interbank market can have wide-reaching effects in the financial system and the real economy by influencing the investment decisions of firms and households.

Efficient functioning of the markets for such instruments relies on well-established and stable reference rates. The benchmark rate used to price many US financial securities is the three-month US dollar Libor rate. Up until the mid-1980s, the Treasury bill rate was the leading reference rate. However, it eventually lost its benchmark status to Libor due to pricing volatility caused by periodic, large swings in the supply of bills. In general, offshore reference rates such as the US dollar Libor rate are preferred to onshore benchmarks since the former are less likely to be distorted by government regulations such as capital controls and deposit insurance.

=== Monetary policy transmission ===
Central banks in many economies implement monetary policy by manipulating instruments to achieve a specified value of an operating target. Instruments refer to the variables that central banks directly control; examples include reserve requirements, the interest rate paid on funds borrowed from the central bank, and balance sheet composition. Operating targets are typically measures of bank reserves or short-term interest rates such as the overnight interbank rate. These targets are set to achieve specified policy goals which differ across central banks depending on their specific mandates.^{1}

==== US federal funds market ====
US monetary policy implementation involves intervening in the unsecured interbank lending market known as the fed funds market. Federal funds (fed funds) are uncollateralized loans of reserve balances at Federal Reserve banks. The majority of lending in the fed funds market is overnight, but some transactions have longer maturities. The market is an over-the-counter (OTC) market where parties negotiate loan terms either directly with each other or through a fed funds broker. Most of these overnight loans are booked without a contract and consist of a verbal agreement between parties. Participants in the fed funds market include: commercial banks, savings and loan associations, branches of foreign banks in the US, federal agencies, and primary dealers.

Depository institutions in the US are subject to reserve requirements, regulations set by the Board of Governors of the Federal Reserve which oblige banks to keep a specified amount of funds (reserves) in their accounts at the Fed as insurance against deposit outflows and other balance sheet fluctuations. It is common for banks to end up with too many or too few reserves in their accounts at the Fed. Banks had a strong incentive to lend out excess reserves until October 2008, when the incentive was reduced because Fed began paying interest on reserves. In July 2009 the Fed Chairman identified interest paid on reserves as the "most important tool" the Fed could use to raise interest rates. Prior to March 2020 the reserve requirement for banks was 10%, but in March 2020 the reserve requirement was reduced to zero.

==== Interest rate channel of monetary policy ====
The interest rate channel of monetary policy refers to the effect of monetary policy actions on interest rates that influence the investment and consumption decisions of households and businesses. Along this channel, the transmission of monetary policy to the real economy relies on linkages between central bank instruments, operating targets, and policy goals. For example, when the Federal Reserve conducts open market operations in the federal funds market, the instrument it is manipulating is its holdings of government securities. The Fed's operating target is the overnight federal funds rate and its policy goals are maximum employment, stable prices, and moderate long-term interest rates. For the interest rate channel of monetary policy to work, open market operations must affect the overnight federal funds rate which must influence the interest rates on loans extended to households and businesses.

As explained in the previous section, many US financial instruments are actually based on the US dollar Libor rate, not the effective federal funds rate. Successful monetary policy transmission thus requires a linkage between the Fed's operating targets and interbank lending reference rates such as Libor. During the 2008 financial crisis, a weakening of this linkage posed major challenges for central banks and was one factor that motivated the creation of liquidity and credit facilities. Thus, conditions in interbank lending markets can have important effects on the implementation and transmission of monetary policy.

== Strains in interbank lending markets during the 2008 financial crisis ==
By mid-2007, cracks started to appear in markets for asset-backed securities. For example, in June 2007, ratings agencies downgraded over 100 bonds backed by second-lien subprime mortgages. Soon after, the investment bank Bear Stearns liquidated two hedge funds that had invested heavily in mortgage-backed securities (MBS) and a few large mortgage lenders filed for Chapter 11 bankruptcy protection. Strains in interbank lending markets became apparent on August 9, 2007, after BNP Paribas announced that it was halting redemptions on three of its investment funds. That morning the US dollar Libor rate climbed over 10 basis points (bps) and remained elevated thereafter. The US LIBOR-OIS spread ballooned to over 90bps in September whereas it had averaged 10bps in prior months.

At the following FOMC meeting (September 18, 2007), the Fed started to ease monetary policy aggressively in response to the turmoil in financial markets. In the minutes from the September FOMC meeting, Fed officials characterized the interbank lending market as significantly impaired:

“Banks took measures to conserve their liquidity and were cautious about counterparties’ exposures to asset-backed commercial paper. Term interbank funding markets were significantly impaired, with rates rising well above expected future overnight rates and traders reporting a substantial drop in the availability of term funding.”

By the end of 2007, the Federal Reserve had cut the fed funds target rate by 100bps and initiated several liquidity-providing programs and yet the Libor-OIS spread remained elevated. Meanwhile, for most of 2008, term funding conditions remained stressed. In September 2008, when the US government decided not to bail out the investment bank Lehman Brothers, credit markets went from being strained to completely broken and the Libor-OIS spread blew out to over 350bps.

=== Possible explanations ===
==== Increase in counterparty risk ====
An increase in counterparty risk reduces lending banks’ expected payoffs from providing unsecured funds to other banks and thus lowers their incentive to transact with one another. This is a result from Stiglitz and Weiss (1981): the expected return on a loan to a bank is a decreasing function of the riskiness of the loan. Stiglitz and Weiss also show that increases in funding costs can lead safe borrowers to drop out of the market, making the remaining pool of borrowers more risky. Thus, adverse selection may have exacerbated strains in interbank lending markets once Libor rates were on the rise.

The market environment at the time was not inconsistent with an increase in counterparty risk and a higher degree of information asymmetry. In the second half of 2007, market participants and regulators started to become aware of the risks in securitized products and derivatives. Many banks were in the process of writing down the values of their mortgage-related portfolios. House prices were falling all over the country and the ratings agencies had just started to downgrade subprime mortgages. Concerns about structured investment vehicles (SIVs) and mortgage and bond insurers were growing. Moreover, there was very high uncertainty about how to value complex securitized instruments and where in the financial system these securities were concentrated.

==== Liquidity hoarding ====
Another possible explanation for the seizing up of interbank lending is that banks were hoarding liquidity in anticipation of future shortages. Two modern features of the financial industry suggest this hypothesis is not implausible. First, banks have come to rely much less on deposits as a source of funds and more on short-term wholesale funding (brokered CDs, asset-backed commercial paper (ABCP), interbank repurchase agreements, etc.). Many of these markets came under stress during the early phase of the crisis, particularly the ABCP market. This meant banks had fewer sources of funds to turn to, although an increase in retail deposits over this period provided some offset.

Second, it has become common for corporations to turn to markets rather than banks for short-term funding. In particular, before the crisis firms were regularly tapping commercial paper markets for funds. These corporations still had lines of credit set up with banks, but they used them more as a source of insurance. After the near collapse of the commercial paper market, however, firms took advantage of this insurance and banks had no choice but to provide the liquidity. Thus, firms’ use of credit lines during the crisis increased illiquidity risks for banks. Lastly, banks’ off-balance sheet programs (SIVs for example) relied on short-term ABCP to operate; when this market dried up, banks in some cases had to take the assets from these vehicles onto their balance sheets. All of these factors made liquidity risk management especially challenging during this time.

== Glossary of key interbank lending rates ==
=== United States ===
==== Federal funds rate ====
The federal funds rate is the weighted average rate at which banks lend to each other in the overnight funds market, also known as the US overnight rate. The actual rate is determined daily by market conditions, but the Federal Reserve System uses various methods to influence the rate toward a target range. These include issuing cash in exchange for bonds and paying banks to maintain excess reserves.

==== US dollar Libor rate ====
The US dollar Libor rate, short for the London interbank offer rate, is the rate at which banks indicate they are willing to lend to other banks for a specified term. Previously it was the British Banker's Association average of interbank rates for dollar deposits in the London market. However, the administration of the rate has been transferred to the Intercontinental Exchange. Term Libor rates reflect the expected path of monetary policy as well as a risk premium associated with credit and liquidity risks.

=== Europe ===
In the Eurozone, the interbank lending rate is called Euribor, published on euribor-ebf website.

=== Shanghai ===
In Shanghai, the interbank lending rate is called SHIBOR, published on the SHIBOR website.

=== Hong Kong ===
In Hong Kong, the interbank lending rate is called HIBOR, published by the Hong Kong Association of Banks.

=== Australia ===
In Australia, the overnight interbank lending rate is called the cash rate.

== See also ==
- Market liquidity
- Liquidity crisis
- Money market
- Libor
- Euribor
- Libor-OIS spread

== Notes ==
1. For example, the Federal Reserve's policy objectives include maximum employment, stable prices, and moderate long-term interest rates whereas the Bank of England's mandate is to keep prices stable and to maintain confidence in the currency.
