= Trojan horse (business) =

Type of advertising offer

In business, a trojan horse is an advertising offer made by a company that is designed to draw potential customers by offering them cash or something of value for acceptance, but following acceptance, the buyer is forced to spend a much larger amount of money, either by being signed into a lengthy contract, from which exit is difficult, or by having money automatically drawn in some other method. The harmful consequences faced by the customer may include spending far above market rate, large amount of debt, or identity theft.

The term, which originated in New England during the 2000s, and has spread to some other parts of the United States, is also sometimes used in reference to an item offered seemingly at a bargain price. But through fine print and other hidden trick, the item is ultimately sold at above market rate.

Some of the items involved in trojan horse sales include cash, gift cards or merchandise viewed as a high-ticket item, but the item actually being given away is made cheaply, has a very low value, and does not satisfy the expectations of the recipient. Meanwhile, the victim of the trojan horse is likely to end up spending far more money over time, either through continual withdrawals from the customer's bank account, charges to a debit or credit card, or add-ons to a bill that must be paid in order to avoid loss of an object or service of prime importance (such as a house, car, or phone line).

Victims of trojan horses include poor people or those who are searching for bargains or the best price on an item. Many of these victims end up with overdrawn accounts or over-the-limit on their credit cards due to fees that are automatically charged. Some of the businesses using trojan horse marketing include banks, internet and cell phone service providers, record and book clubs and other companies in which the customer will be expected to have a continuing relationship. Banks often offer cash initially for opening an account, but later charge fees in much larger amounts to the account holder. Auto-manufacturers and car dealerships will often advertise free or subsidized gas to car buyers for a certain amount of time, but increase the cost of the car in other ways. Cell phone companies use trojan horse marketing by attempting to sell items like ringtones to customers, who unknowingly are sold many more ringtones over time.

== See also ==
- Bait-and-switch
- Freebie marketing
- Teaser rate
- Timeshare
