= Mortgage note =

Promissory note

In the United States, a mortgage note (also known as a real estate lien note or borrower's note) is a promissory note secured by a specified mortgage loan.

Mortgage notes are a written promise to repay a specified sum of money plus interest at a specified rate and length of time to fulfill the promise. While the mortgage deed or contract itself hypothecates or imposes a lien on the title to real property as security for a loan, the mortgage note states the amount of debt and the rate of interest, and obligates the borrower, who signs the note, personally for repayment. In foreclosure proceedings in certain jurisdictions, borrowers may require the foreclosing party to produce the note as evidence that they are the true owners of the debt.

== In Australia ==
Technical product definitions can vary between countries. In Australia, as example, a mortgage note is a secured (senior debt) debt security (also known as secured credit bond) which can be issued in relation to an entire specified credit transaction (so one isolated and entire loan transaction) or parts thereof. Whilst Australian debt securities are very diverse, mortgage notes by definition refer to transactions that are underpinned by registered mortgage over real property collateral, which offer distinct advantages to secured parties such an indefeasibility, which do not extend to unregistered mortgages.

For the first time in October 2019, through an announcement to the Australian Securities Exchange, fractionalised mortgage notes named "MNotes" were offered as debt securities. In that instance the distinct difference was the structuring of these securities. Instead of one mortgage note per entire transaction, now 1 MNote is issued for every $1.00 of a specified secured credit bond, ranked pari passu with other MNotes issued in respect of one specified transaction and attracting a coupon based on the overall assessment of risk of such underlying transaction. Just like with fixed rate bonds and other debt securities coupon (the yield offered as return) and principal become due upon maturity of the mortgage note or MNote. Yield on mortgage notes and/ or MNotes is reflective of terms offered, liquidity, credit quality, ranking and type of property collateral.

Like other investment instruments offered within Australia, mortgage notes can only be issued by registered managed investment schemes and/ or holders of an Australian financial services licence outlining all investment terms and conditions

== Determinants of mortgage type ==
For the most part, it is the mortgage note which determines the "type" of mortgage:

- if the note has a fixed interest rate and payments, then the loan is a fixed-rate mortgage (FRM) loan
- a fixed interest rate with adjusting payments is a Graduated Payment Mortgage (GPM)
- a floating interest rate and payment amount indicates an adjustable-rate mortgage (ARM)
- an amortization schedule longer than the maturity date indicates a balloon payment mortgage
- when the payment schedule calls only for interest and no principal, thus leaving behind the full principal due at maturity, the loan is an interest-only loan
- a payment adjustment frequency less than the interest rate adjustment frequency implies a mortgage which allows for negative amortization

== Mortgage notes as investments ==
Like bonds, mortgage notes offer investors a stream of payments over a period of time. Mortgage notes are traded on the secondary market whole or as part of a mortgage-backed security. Unlike bonds, mortgage note prices are quoted as a percentage figure, e.g., 95 for 95%. When determining if a whole-loan mortgage note would make a good investment in one's portfolio, one would need to consider the characteristics and circumstances surrounding the creation of the loan, the collateral or property securing the loan as well as the structure of the loan in conjunction with the borrower's financial background.

=== Importance ===
In the United Kingdom, mortgage-related debt amounts to over £1 trillion. In the United States bond market, mortgage-related debt amounts to $6.5 trillion and accounted for 23% of the market as of December 31, 2006. In 2006, $1.93 trillion of mortgage debt was issued on the US bond market; this is roughly the GDP of the United Kingdom, and is larger than any other debt category.

=== Risks ===
The risks associated with mortgage notes are very similar to those of bonds:

- credit risk, i.e., the risk that the borrower will default
- You will foreclose and get your money back
- prepayment risk (borrowers have a call option, i.e., they can pay the debt back early)

For a fee, guarantors such as Fannie Mae, Freddie Mac, and Ginnie Mae guarantee mortgage backed securities against homeowner default risk, thus reducing the credit risk associated with mortgage notes.

=== Investors ===
Mortgage note buyers are companies or investors with the capital to purchase a mortgage note. If someone is holding a private mortgage, these investors will give cash and take over receiving the monthly payments that were being paid to the previous owner. A mortgage note for these investors are home loans or mortgages that are secured by real estate. Mortgage notes could be anything from $10,000 to tens of millions of dollars.

Note buyers can buy notes on nearly any type of property, although owner-occupied single family houses tend to get the best pricing. A note buyer will offer a certain price based on their perceived risk factors, which include the amount of equity in the property, the payer's credit, the type and condition of the property and surrounding area, elements of the note, etc. Most U.S.-based note buyers will only buy in the 50 states, though some do advertise as being able to buy notes in Canada.

=== Comparison to other investments ===
The advantage of a mortgage note over other investments is that a mortgage note will allow one to collect the interest on a monthly basis. There are no sales commissions or fees taken out of a mortgage note investment.

== Produce the note defense in foreclosure proceedings ==
The chain of title of a promissory note is very important to every homeowner in America. The inability to show a complete chain of title and ownership of a promissory note from Lender A to Lender B to Lender C, etc. has become a major impediment in mortgage servicers ability to foreclose on properties in judicial foreclosure states and in relief of stays in Federal Bankruptcy Court. The issue of standing (in other words, the question of who has the legal right to sue), is the foundation of the produce-the-note strategy, which forces a lender prove that it has a legal right to sue.

Attorneys estimate that the documents belonging to as many as 50% of the mortgages made between 2001 and 2008 have been lost or destroyed, leading to demands by borrowers that the foreclosing party produce the note as evidence of the debt.

Consumer advocates claim that almost all entities attempting to foreclose on homeowners are not the Real Lender, but rather a Servicer collecting monthly payments for a mortgage backed security (MBS) Trust. Therefore, courts have determined that Servicers are not the Real Party in Interest and possess no legal standing to seek relief from the courts.
