= Negative amortization =

Amortization method

In finance, negative amortization (also known as NegAm, deferred interest or graduated payment mortgage) occurs whenever the loan payment for any period is less than the interest charged over that period so that the outstanding balance of the loan increases. As an amortization method the shorted amount (difference between interest and repayment) is then added to the total amount owed to the lender. Such a practice would have to be agreed upon before shorting the payment so as to avoid default on payment. This method is generally used in an introductory period before loan payments exceed interest and the loan becomes self-amortizing. The term is most often used for mortgage loans; corporate loans with negative amortization are called PIK loans.

Amortization refers to the process of paying off a debt (often from a loan or mortgage) through regular payments. A portion of each payment is for interest while the remaining amount is applied towards the principal balance. The percentage of interest versus principal in each payment is determined in an amortization schedule.

== Defining characteristics ==
Negative amortization only occurs in loans in which the periodic payment does not cover the amount of interest due for that loan period. The unpaid accrued interest is then capitalized monthly into the outstanding principal balance. The result of this is that the loan balance (or principal) increases by the amount of the unpaid interest on a monthly basis. The purpose of such a feature is most often for advanced cash management and/or more simply payment flexibility, but not to increase overall affordability.

Neg-Ams also have what is called a recast period, and the recast principal balance cap is in the U.S. based on federal and state legislation. The recast period is usually 60 months (5 years). The recast principal balance cap (also known as the "neg am limit") is usually up to a 25% increase of the amortized loan balance over the original loan amount. States and lenders can offer products with lesser recast periods and principal balance caps; but cannot issue loans that exceed their state and federal legislated requirements under penalty of law.

A newer loan option has been introduced which allows for a 40-year loan term. This makes the minimum payment even lower than a comparable 30-year term.

== Special cases ==
- Reverse mortgage: In the extreme or limiting case of the principle of negative amortization, the borrower in a loan does not need to make payments on the loan until the loan comes due; that is, all interest is capitalized, and the original principal and all interest accrued as of the due date are paid off together and at once. The most common context in which this arrangement occurs is that of using residential single-family real estate as collateral for the loan, in which case the loan is known as a reverse mortgage. In the United States of America, the terms of reverse mortgages are heavily regulated by federal law, which as of January 2016 places a lower age limit on the set of permitted borrowers and requires that the mortgage come due only when the borrower no longer uses the property in question as his/her principal residence, usually due to the borrower's death.

Due to the specificity of the reverse-mortgage concept and the limited context in which the term appears in practice, most United States authorities use the term "negative amortization" to denote those and only those loans in which the borrower pays throughout the lifetime of the loan but during and only during its early stages, known as the negative-amortization or "NegAm" period, makes what are in effect partial payments, namely payments lower than the amount of interest accrued during the payment term.

== Typical circumstances ==
All NegAM home loans eventually require full repayment of principal and interest according to the original term of the mortgage and note signed by the borrower. Most loans only allow NegAM to happen for no more than 5 years, and have terms to "Recast" (see below) the payment to a fully amortizing schedule if the borrower allows the principal balance to rise to a pre-specified amount.

This loan is written often in high cost areas, because the monthly mortgage payments will be lower than any other type of financing instrument.

Negative amortization loans can be high risk loans for inexperienced investors. These loans tend to be safer in a falling rate market and riskier in a rising rate market.

Start rates on negative amortization or minimum payment option loans can be as low as 1%. This is the payment rate, not the actual interest rate. The payment rate is used to calculate the minimum payment. Other minimum payment options include 1.95% or more.

== Adjustable rate feature ==
NegAM loans today are mostly straight adjustable rate mortgages (ARMs), meaning that they are fixed for a certain period and adjust every time that period has elapsed; e.g., one month fixed, adjusting every month. The NegAm loan, like all adjustable rate mortgages, is tied to a specific financial index which is used to determine the interest rate based on the current index and the margin (the markup the lender charges). Most NegAm loans today are tied to the Monthly Treasury Average, in keeping with the monthly adjustments of this loan. There are also Hybrid ARM loans in which there is a period of fixed payments for months or years, followed by an increased change cycle, such as six months fixed, then monthly adjustable.

The graduated payment mortgage is a "fixed rate" NegAm loan, but since the payment increases over time, it has aspects of the ARM loan until amortizing payments are required.

The most notable differences between the traditional payment option ARM and the hybrid payment option ARM are in the start rate, also known as the "minimum payment" rate. On a Traditional Payment Option Arm, the minimum payment is based on a principal and interest calculation of 1% - 2.5% on average.

The start rate on a hybrid payment option ARM is higher, yet still extremely competitive payment wise.

On a hybrid payment option ARM, the minimum payment is derived using the "interest only" calculation of the start rate. The start rate on the hybrid payment option ARM typically is calculated by taking the fully indexed rate (actual note rate), then subtracting 3%, which will give you the start rate.

Example: 7.5% fully indexed rate − 3% = 4.5% (4.5% would be the start rate on a hybrid pay option ARM)

This guideline can vary among lenders.

Aliases the payment option ARM loans are known by:

- PayOption ARM
- Negative Amortizing Loan (Neg Am)
- Pick - A - Pay
- Deferred interest option loan (this is the way this loan was introduced to the mortgage industry when first created)

== Mortgage terminology ==
=== Cap ===
Percentage rate of change in the NegAm payment. Each year, the minimum payment due rises. Most minimum payments today rise at 7.5%. Considering that raising a rate 1% on a mortgage at 5% is a 20% increase, the NegAm can grow quickly in a rising market. Typically after the 5th year, the loan is recast to an adjustable loan due in 25 years. This is for a 30-year loan term. Newer payment option loans often offer a 40-year term with a higher underlying interest rate.

=== Life cap ===
The maximum interest rate allowed after recast according to the terms of the note. Generally, most NegAm loans in the last 5 years have a life cap of 9.95%. Today, many of these loans are capped at 12% or above.

=== Index ===
The variable, such as the COFI; COSI; CODI or often MTA, which determines the adjustment as an increase or decrease in the interest rate. Other examples include the LIBOR and TREASURY.

=== Margin ===
Often disclosed in the adjustable rate rider of a deed of trust, the margin is determined by the lender and is used to calculate the interest rate. Often the loan originator can increase the margin when structuring the product for the borrower. An increase to the margin will also increase the borrower's interest rate, but will improve the yield spread premium which the loan originator may receive as compensation from the lender.

=== Fully indexed rate (F.I.R.) ===
The fully indexed rate is the sum of the margin and the current index value at the time of adjustment. The F.I.R. is the "interest rate" and determines the interest only, 30 year and 15 year amortized payments. Most adjustable rate products have caps on rate adjustments. If the note provides for a single adjustment not to exceed an increase by more than 1.5, and the variable index, for example, increased by 2.5 since the last adjustment, the fully indexed rate will top out at a maximum adjustment of 1.5, as stated in the note, for that particular adjustment period. Often the F.I.R. is used to determine the debt to income ratio when qualifying a borrower for this loan product.

=== Payment options ===
There are typically four payment options (listed from highest to lowest):

- 15-year payment: Amortized over a period of 15 years at the F.I.R.
- 30-year payment: Amortized over a period of 30 years at the F.I.R.
- Interest-only payment: F.I.R. times the principal balance, divided by 12 months (with no amortization or reduction in the owed balance).
- Minimum payment: Based on the minimal start rate determined by the lender. When paying the minimum payment, the difference between the interest-only payment and the minimum payment is deferred to the balance of the loan, increasing what is owed on the mortgage.

=== Period ===
How often the NegAm payment changes. Typically, the minimum payment rises once every twelve months in these types of loans. Usually the rate of rise is 7.5%. The F.I.R. is subject to adjusting with the variable Index, most often on a monthly basis, depending on the product.

=== Recast ===
Premature stop of NegAm. Should the balance increase to a predetermined amount (from 110% up to 125% of the original balance per federal or state regulations) the loan will be "recast" with one of two payment options: the fully amortized principal and interest payment, or if the maximum balance has been reached before the fifth year, an interest only payment until the loan has matured to the recast date (typically 5 years).

=== Stop ===
End of NegAm payment schedule.

== Criticism ==
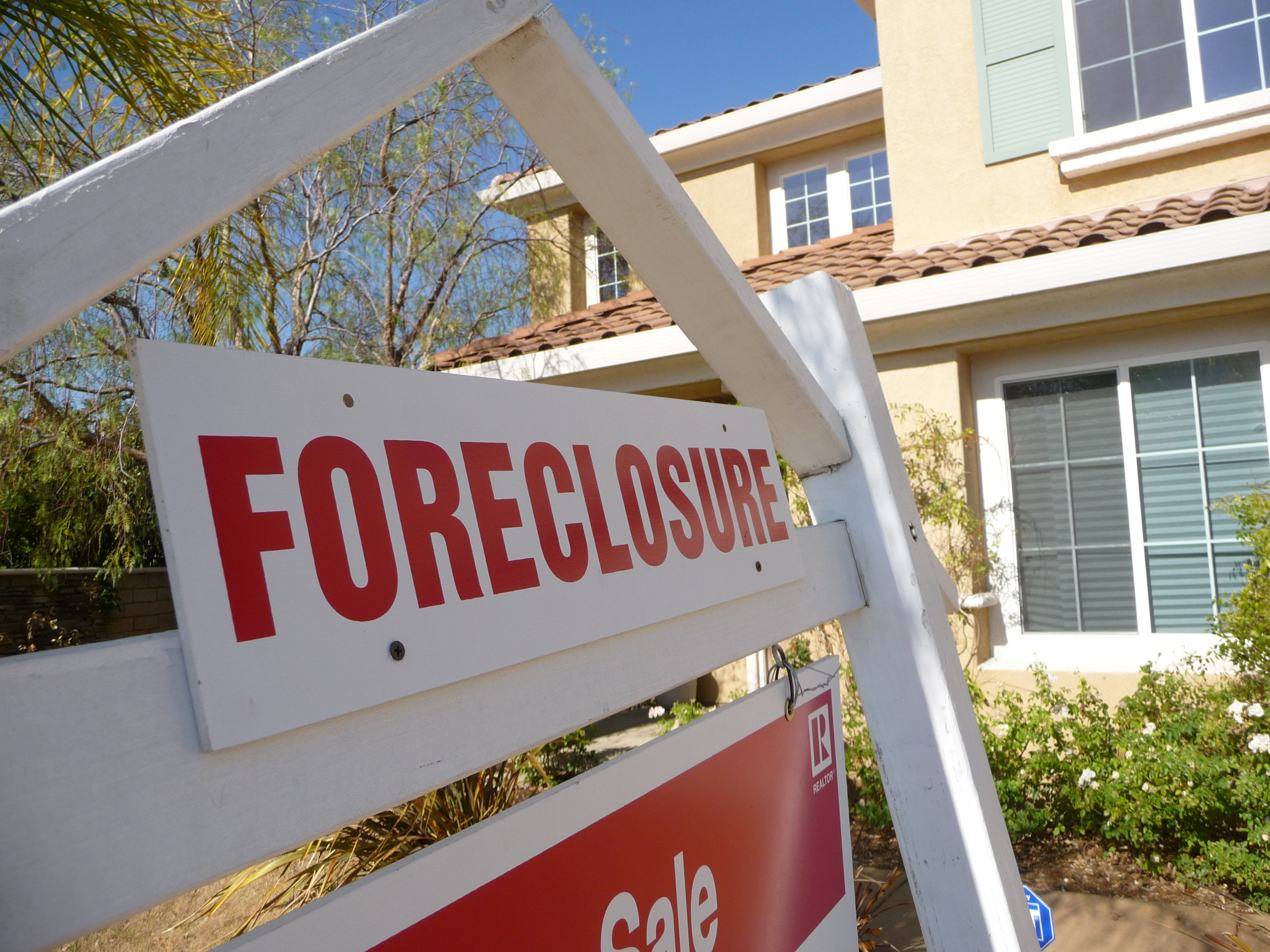
Foreclosure

Negative-amortization loans, being relatively popular only in the last decade, have attracted a variety of criticisms.

Unlike most other adjustable-rate loans, many negative-amortization loans have been advertised with either teaser or artificial, introductory interest rates or with the minimum loan payment expressed as a percentage of the loan amount. For example, a negative-amortization loan is often advertised as featuring "1% interest", or by prominently displaying a 1% number without explaining the F.I.R. This practice has been done by large corporate lenders.

This practice has been considered deceptive for two different reasons:

1. Most mortgages do not feature teaser rates, so consumers do not look out for them; and, many consumers are not aware of the negative amortization side effect of only paying 1% of the loan amount per year.
2. Most negative amortization loans contain a clause saying that the payment may not increase more than 7.5% each year, except if the 5-year period is over or if the balance has grown by 15%. Critics say this clause is only there to deceive borrowers into thinking the payment could only jump a small amount, whereas in fact the other two conditions are more likely to occur.

Negative-amortization loans as a class have the highest potential for what is known as payment shock. Payment shock is when the required monthly payment jumps from one month to the next, potentially becoming unaffordable. To compare various mortgages' payment-shock potential (note that the items here do not include escrow payments for insurance and taxes, which can cause changes in the payment amount):

- 30-year (or 15-year) fixed-rate fully amortized mortgages: No possible payment jump.
- 5-year adjustable-rate fully amortized mortgage: No payment jump for 5 years, then a possible payment decrease or increase based on the new interest rate.
- A 10-year interest only mortgage product, recasting to a 20-year amortization schedule (after ten years of interest-only payments) could see a payment increase of up to $600 on a balance of $330,000.
- Negative amortization mortgage: No payment jump either until 5 years or the balance grows 15% (depending on the product) higher than the original amount. The payment increases, by requiring a full interest-plus-principal payment. The payment could further increase due to interest-rate changes. However, all things being equal, the fully amortized payment is almost triple the negatively amortized payment.
- First month free: A loan officer may allow the borrower to skip the first monthly payment on a refinance loan, by simply adding that payment to the principal and charging compound interest on it for many years. The borrower may not understand or question the transaction.

In a very hot real estate market, a buyer may use a negative-amortizing mortgage to purchase a property with the plan to sell the property at a higher price before the end of the "negam" period. Therefore, an informed investor could purchase several properties with minimal monthly obligations and make a great profit over a five-year plan in a rising real-estate market.

However, if the property values decrease, it is likely that the borrower will owe more on the property than it is worth, known colloquially in the mortgage industry as "being underwater". In this situation, the property owner may be faced with foreclosure or having to refinance with a very high loan-to-value ratio requiring additional monthly obligations, such as mortgage insurance, and higher rates and payments due to the adversity of a high loan-to-value ratio.

It is very easy for borrowers to ignore or misunderstand the complications of this product when being presented with minimal monthly obligations that could be from one half to one third what other, more predictable, mortgage products require.

== See also ==
- PIK loan, a similar concept in corporate finance
