= Yield spread premium =

Money paid to brokers for giving a borrower willingly to pay high interest rate

A yield spread premium (YSP) is the money or rebate paid to a mortgage broker for giving a borrower a higher interest rate on a loan in exchange for lower up front costs, generally paid in origination fees, broker fees or discount points. This “may [be used to] wipe out or offset other loan costs, like Loan Level Pricing Adjustments (instituted by FNMA).”
