= HIBOR =

Reference rate of Hong Kong

Hong Kong Inter-bank Offered Rate (HIBOR; Chinese: 香港銀行同業拆息) is the annualized rate charged for inter-bank lending on Hong Kong Dollar (HKD) denominated instruments, for a specified period ranging from overnight to one year. It is calculated daily at 11:00 a.m. local time based on quotations from 20 banks designated by the Hong Kong Association of Banks (HKAB).

On 24 June 2013, an additional fixing was launched for off-shore Chinese renminbi (CNH), designated as CNH HIBOR.

== Definition ==
In Hong Kong, HIBOR is officially called the "Hong Kong Dollar Interest Settlement Rates". It is defined in the Guide to Hong Kong Monetary, Banking and Financial Terms as "The rate of interest offered on Hong Kong dollar loans by banks in the interbank market for a specified period ranging from overnight to one year."

HIBOR is fixed by the Hong Kong Association of Banks (HKAB) by reference to market rates for HKD deposits in the Hong Kong interbank market. These fixings are usually released on the website of the HKAB each business day (excluding Saturdays) at 11:15 a.m., on the basis of quotations provided by 12 to 20 banks designated by the HKAB. HIBOR calculated by averaging the middle quotes after excluding the highest three quotes and lowest three quotes received from the reference banks.

== See also ==
- Interbank lending market
- LIBOR
