= Singapore Swap Offer Rate =

Implied interest rate

Singapore Dollar Swap Offer Rate (SOR) is an implied interest rate, determined by examining the spot and forward foreign exchange rate between the US dollar (USD) and Singapore dollar (SGD) and the appropriate US dollar interest rate for the term of the forward.

== Overview ==
SOR reflects the cost of borrowing SGD synthetically by borrowing USD and subsequently "swapping" to SGD by using an FX Swap. It is an alternative to Singapore Interbank Offered Rate (SIBOR) which is a measure of the interbank money market rates.

As of December 2018, SOR is measured and published periods of overnight, 1 month, 3 month, and 6 month. Like SIBOR, SOR is set by the Association of Banks in Singapore, and is also publicly available.

Residential property loans in Singapore are no longer pegged to SOR as banks have withdrawn them in 2017. SOR-pegged mortgages in recent years are not as popular as SIBOR-linked mortgages or Fixed Deposit Rates linked mortgages due to its volatility. They are still available in the wholesale and commercial lending space.

== See also ==
- ChangeGroup
