= Cost of funds index =

A cost of funds index (COFI) is a regional average of interest expenses incurred by financial institutions, which in turn is used as a base for calculating variable rate loans. The interest rate on an adjustable rate mortgage, for example, is often linked to a regional COFI specified in the particular loan documents. COFIs, in turn, are usually calculated by a self-regulatory agency like Federal Home Loan Banks. In California, for example, many home mortgage loans are indexed to the Federal Home Loan Bank of San Francisco. Interest rates on COFI loans and mortgages tend to fluctuate more slowly than variable-rate loans linked to other indexes. An index used to determine interest rate changes for some adjustable-rate mortgages.

The 11th District Cost of Funds Index was first introduced in December 1982. It is a National Monthly Median Cost of Funds defined as interest (dividends) paid or accrued on deposits for Western American Financial Institutions. It is calculated on the last day of the month.
