= Graduated payment mortgage loan =

Type of mortgage

A graduated payment mortgage loan (GPM) is a mortgage with low initial monthly payments which gradually increase over a specified time frame. These plans are mostly geared towards young people who cannot afford large payments now, but can realistically expect to raise their incomes in the future. For instance a medical student who is just about to finish medical school might not have the financial capability to pay for a mortgage loan, but once graduated, it is more than probable to be earning a high income. It is a form of negative amortization loan.

== Mechanism ==
GPMs are presently only readily available in the United States for mortgages insured by the Federal Housing Administration. Over a period of time, typically 5 to 15 years, the monthly FHA mortgage payments increase every year according to a predetermined percentage. For instance, a borrower may have a 30-year graduated payment mortgage with monthly payments that increase by 7% every year for five years. At the end of five years, the increases stop. The borrower would then pay this new increased amount monthly for the rest of the 25-year loan term.

== Risk ==
The graduated payment mortgage seems to be an attractive option for first-time home buyers or those who currently do not have the resources to afford high monthly home mortgage payments. Even though the amounts of payments are drawn out and scheduled, it requires borrowers to predict their future earnings potential and how much they are able to pay in the future, which may be difficult. If borrowers overestimate their future earning potential they may not be able to keep up with the increased monthly payments.

Even if the graduated payment mortgage lets borrowers save at the present time by paying low monthly amounts, the overall expense of a graduated payment mortgage loan is higher than that of conventional mortgages, especially when negative amortization is involved.
