= Mortgage =

Loan secured using real estate

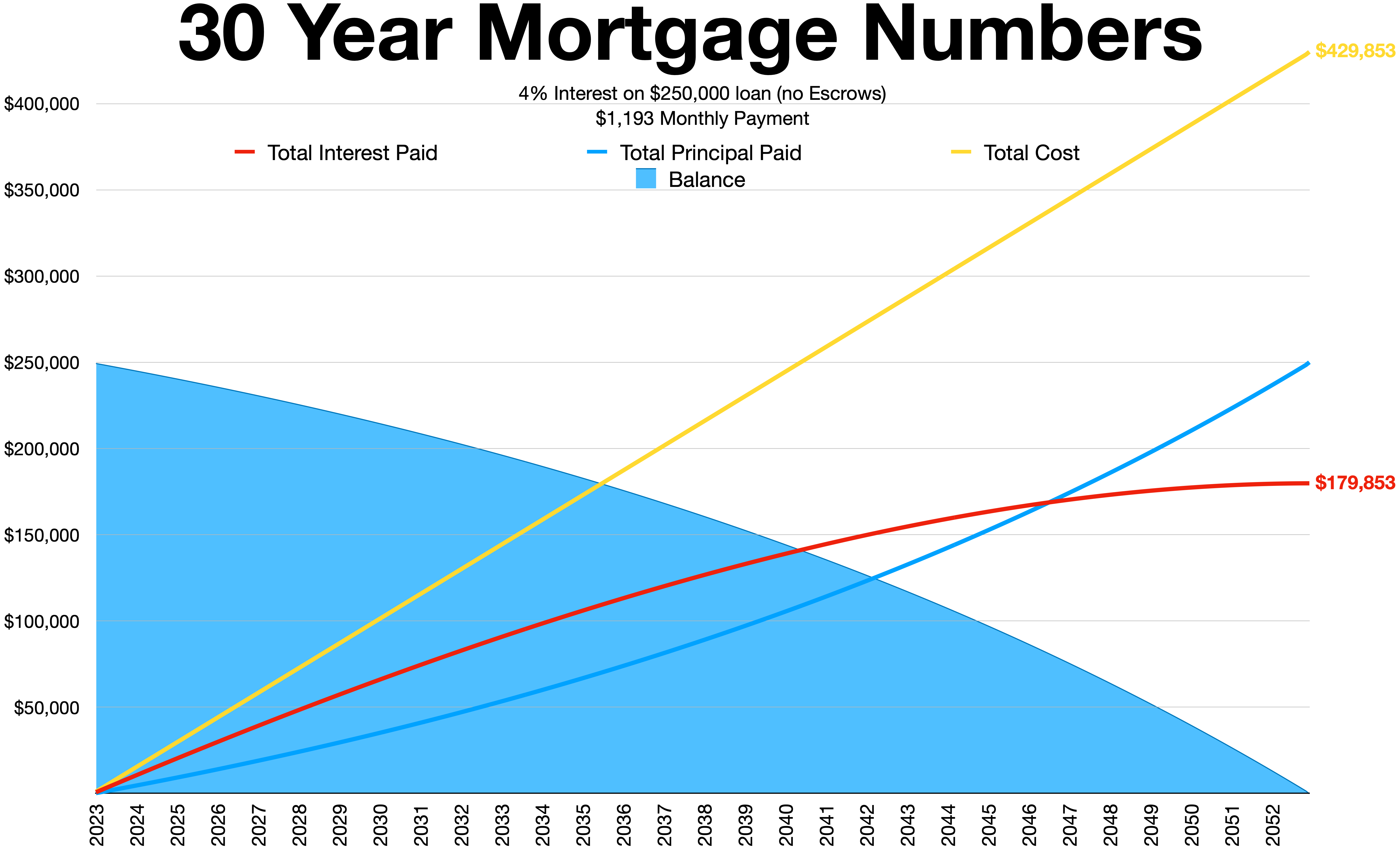
30 year mortgage of 4% on $250,000 loan Total cost Principal paid Total interest paid Remaining balance

A mortgage loan or simply mortgage (/ˈmɔːrɡɪdʒ/), in civil law jurisdictions known also as a hypothec loan, is a loan used either by purchasers of real property to raise funds to buy real estate, or by existing property owners to raise funds for any purpose while putting a lien on the property being mortgaged. The loan is "secured" on the borrower's property through a process known as mortgage origination. This means that a legal mechanism is put into place which allows the lender to take possession and sell the secured property ("foreclosure" or "repossession") to pay off the loan in the event the borrower defaults on the loan or otherwise fails to abide by its terms. The word mortgage is derived from a Law French term used in Britain in the Middle Ages meaning "death pledge" and refers to the pledge ending (dying) when either the obligation is fulfilled or the property is taken through foreclosure. A mortgage can also be described as "a borrower giving consideration in the form of a collateral for a benefit (loan)".

Mortgage borrowers can be individuals mortgaging their home or they can be businesses mortgaging commercial property (for example, their own business premises, residential property let to tenants, or an investment portfolio). The lender will typically be a financial institution, such as a bank, credit union or building society, depending on the country concerned, and the loan arrangements can be made either directly or indirectly through intermediaries. Features of mortgage loans such as the size of the loan, maturity of the loan, interest rate, method of paying off the loan, and other characteristics can vary considerably. The lender's rights over the secured property take priority over the borrower's other creditors, which means that if the borrower becomes bankrupt or insolvent, the other creditors will only be repaid the debts owed to them from a sale of the secured property if the mortgage lender is repaid in full first.

In many jurisdictions, it is normal for home purchases to be funded by a mortgage loan. Few individuals have enough savings or liquid funds to enable them to purchase property outright. In countries where the demand for home ownership is highest, strong domestic markets for mortgages have developed. Mortgages can either be funded through the banking sector (that is, through short-term deposits) or through the capital markets through a process called "securitization", which converts pools of mortgages into fungible bonds that can be sold to investors in small denominations.

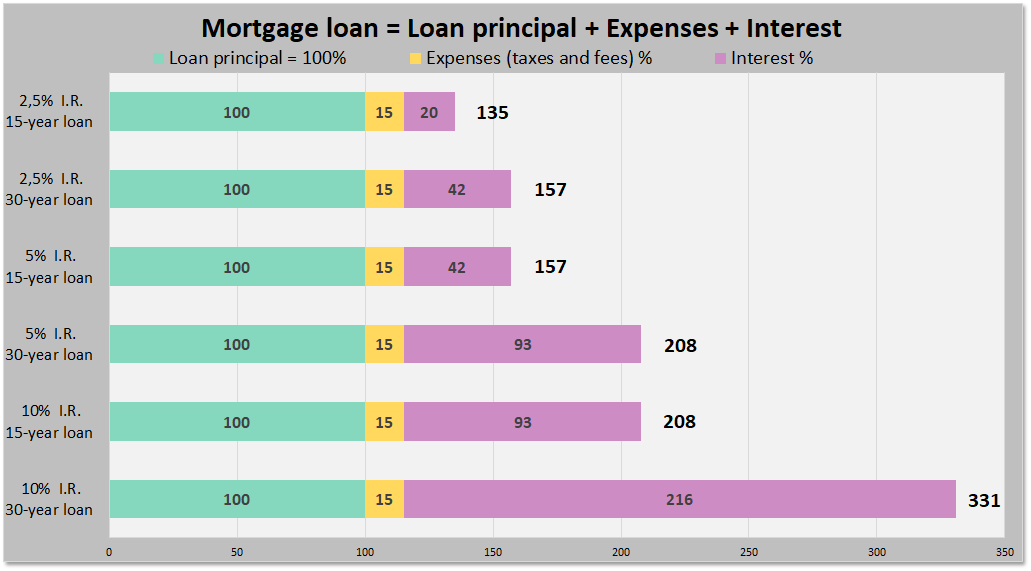
Mortgage loan. Total payment (3 fixed interest rates and 2 loan term) = loan principal + expenses (taxes and fees) + total interest to be paid. The final cost will be exactly the same: * when the interest rate is 2.5% and the term is 30 years than when the interest rate is 5% and the term is 15 years * when the interest rate is 5% and the term is 30 years than when the interest rate is 10% and the term is 15 years

== Mortgage loan basics ==
=== Basic concepts and legal regulation ===
According to Anglo-American property law, a mortgage occurs when an owner (usually of a fee simple / freehold interest in real property, but frequently leasehold in England and Wales) pledges his or her interest (right to the property) as security or collateral for a loan. Therefore, a mortgage is an encumbrance (limitation) on the right to the property just as an easement would be, but because most mortgages occur as a condition for new loan money, the word mortgage has become the generic term for a loan secured by such real property. As with other types of loans, mortgages have an interest rate and are scheduled to amortize over a set period of time, typically 30 years in the United States. All types of real property can be, and usually are, secured with a mortgage and bear an interest rate that is supposed to reflect the lender's risk.

Mortgage lending is the primary mechanism used in many countries to finance private ownership of residential and commercial property (see commercial mortgages). Although the terminology and precise forms will differ from country to country, the basic components tend to be similar:

- Property: the physical residence being financed. The exact form of ownership will vary from country to country and may restrict the types of lending that are possible.
- Mortgage: the security interest of the lender in the property, which may entail restrictions on the use or disposal of the property. Restrictions may include requirements to purchase home insurance and mortgage insurance, or pay off outstanding debt before selling the property.
- Borrower (also called a "mortgagor"): the person borrowing who either has or is creating an ownership interest in the property.
- Lender (also called a "mortgagee"): any lender, but usually a bank or other financial institution. (In some countries, particularly the United States, Lenders may also be investors who own an interest in the mortgage through a mortgage-backed security. In such a situation, the initial lender is known as the mortgage originator, which then packages and sells the loan to investors. The payments from the borrower are thereafter collected by a loan servicer.)
- Principal: the original size of the loan, which may or may not include certain other costs; as any principal is repaid, the principal will go down in size.
- Interest: a financial charge for use of the lender's money.
- Foreclosure or repossession: the possibility that the lender has to foreclose, repossess or seize the property under certain circumstances is essential to a mortgage loan; without this aspect, the loan is arguably no different from any other type of loan.
- Completion: legal completion of the mortgage deed, and hence the start of the mortgage.
- Redemption: final repayment of the amount outstanding, which may be a "natural redemption" at the end of the scheduled term or a lump sum redemption, typically when the borrower decides to sell the property. A closed mortgage account is said to be "redeemed".

Many other specific characteristics are common to many markets, but the above are the essential features. Governments usually regulate many aspects of mortgage lending, either directly (through legal requirements, for example) or indirectly (through regulation of the participants or the financial markets, such as the banking industry), and often through state intervention (direct lending by the government, direct lending by state-owned banks, or sponsorship of various entities). Other aspects that define a specific mortgage market may be regional, historical, or driven by specific characteristics of the legal or financial system.

Mortgage loans are generally structured as long-term loans, the periodic payments for which are similar to an annuity and calculated according to the time value of money formulae. The most basic arrangement would require a fixed monthly payment over a period of ten to thirty years, depending on local conditions. Over this period the principal component of the loan (the original loan) would be slowly paid down through amortization. In practice, many variants are possible and common worldwide and within each country.

Lenders provide funds against property to earn interest income, and generally borrow these funds themselves (for example, by taking deposits or issuing bonds). The price at which the lenders borrow money, therefore, affects the cost of borrowing. Lenders may also, in many countries, sell the mortgage loan to other parties who are interested in receiving the stream of cash payments from the borrower, often in the form of a security (by means of a securitization).

Mortgage lending will also take into account the (perceived) riskiness of the mortgage loan, that is, the likelihood that the funds will be repaid (usually considered a function of the creditworthiness of the borrower); that if they are not repaid, the lender will be able to foreclose on the real estate assets; and the financial, interest rate risk and time delays that may be involved in certain circumstances.

=== Mortgage underwriting ===
During the mortgage loan approval process, a mortgage loan underwriter verifies the financial information that the applicant has provided as to income, employment, credit history and the value of the home being purchased via an appraisal. An appraisal may be ordered. The underwriting process may take a few days to a few weeks. Sometimes the underwriting process takes so long that the provided financial statements need to be resubmitted so they are current. It is advisable to maintain the same employment and not to use or open new credit during the underwriting process. Any changes made in the applicant's credit, employment, or financial information could result in the loan being denied.

=== Mortgage loan types ===
There are many types of mortgages used worldwide, but several factors broadly define the characteristics of the mortgage. All of these may be subject to local regulation and legal requirements.

- Interest: Interest may be fixed for the life of the loan or variable, and change at certain pre-defined periods; the interest rate can also, of course, be higher or lower.
- Term: Mortgage loans generally have a maximum term, that is, the number of years after which an amortizing loan will be repaid. Some mortgage loans may have no amortization, or require full repayment of any remaining balance at a certain date, or even negative amortization.
- Payment amount and frequency: The amount paid per period and the frequency of payments; in some cases, the amount paid per period may change or the borrower may have the option to increase or decrease the amount paid.
- Prepayment: Some types of mortgages may limit or restrict prepayment of all or a portion of the loan, or require payment of a penalty to the lender for prepayment.

The two basic types of amortized loans are the fixed rate mortgage (FRM) and adjustable-rate mortgage (ARM) (also known as a floating rate or variable rate mortgage). In some countries, such as the United States, fixed rate mortgages are the norm, but floating rate mortgages are relatively common. Combinations of fixed and floating rate mortgages are also common, whereby a mortgage loan will have a fixed rate for some period, for example the first five years, and vary after the end of that period.

- In a fixed-rate mortgage, the interest rate, remains fixed for the life (or term) of the loan. In the case of an annuity repayment scheme, the periodic payment remains the same amount throughout the loan. In the case of linear payback, the periodic payment will gradually decrease.
- In an adjustable-rate mortgage, the interest rate is generally fixed for a period of time, after which it will periodically (for example, annually or monthly) adjust up or down to some market index. Adjustable rates transfer part of the interest rate risk from the lender to the borrower and thus are widely used where fixed rate funding is difficult to obtain or prohibitively expensive. Since the risk is transferred to the borrower, the initial interest rate may be, for example, 0.5% to 2% lower than the average 30-year fixed rate; the size of the price differential will be related to debt market conditions, including the yield curve.

The charge to the borrower depends upon the credit risk in addition to the interest rate risk. The mortgage origination and underwriting process involves checking credit scores, debt-to-income, downpayments (deposits), assets, and assessing property value. Jumbo mortgages and subprime lending are not supported by government guarantees and face higher interest rates. Other innovations described below can affect the rates as well. Mortgage interest rates tend to decrease with higher competition between financial institutions.

==== Loan to value and down payments ====
Upon making a mortgage loan for the purchase of a property, lenders usually require that the borrower make a down payment (called a deposit in English law); that is, contribute a portion of the cost of the property. This down payment may be expressed as a portion of the value of the property (see below for a definition of this term). The loan to value ratio (LTV) is the size of the loan against the value of the property. Therefore, a mortgage loan in which the purchaser has made a down payment of 20% has a loan to value ratio of 80%. For loans made against properties that the borrower already owns, the loan to value ratio will be imputed against the estimated value of the property.

The loan to value ratio is considered an important indicator of the riskiness of a mortgage loan: the higher the LTV, the higher the risk that the value of the property (in case of foreclosure) will be insufficient to cover the remaining principal of the loan.

==== Value: appraised, estimated, and actual ====
Since the value of the property is an important factor in understanding the risk of the loan, determining the value is a key factor in mortgage lending. The value may be determined in various ways, but the most common are:

1. Actual or transaction value: this is usually taken to be the purchase price of the property. If the property is not being purchased at the time of borrowing, this information may not be available.
2. Appraised or surveyed value: in most jurisdictions, some form of appraisal of the value by a licensed professional is common. There is often a requirement for the lender to obtain an official appraisal.
3. Estimated value: lenders or other parties may use their own internal estimates, particularly in jurisdictions where no official appraisal procedure exists, but also in some other circumstances.

==== Payment and debt ratios ====
In most countries, a number of more or less standard measures of creditworthiness may be used. Common measures include payment to income (mortgage payments as a percentage of gross or net income); debt-to-income ratio (all debt payments, including mortgage payments, as a percentage of income); and various net worth measures. Higher debt-to-income ratios have been associated with psychological stress.

In many countries, credit scores are used in lieu of or to supplement these measures. There will also be requirements for documentation of the creditworthiness, such as income tax returns, pay stubs, etc. the specifics will vary from location to location. Income tax incentives usually can be applied in forms of tax refunds or tax deduction schemes. The first implies that income tax paid by individual taxpayers will be refunded to the extent of interest on mortgage loans taken to acquire residential property. Income tax deduction implies lowering tax liability to the extent of interest rate paid for the mortgage loan. Many countries have lower requirements for certain borrowers, or "no-doc" / "low-doc" lending standards that may be acceptable under certain circumstances.

Some lenders may also require a potential borrower have one or more months of "reserve assets" available. In other words, the borrower may be required to show the availability of enough assets to pay for the housing costs (including mortgage, taxes, etc.) for a period of time in the event of the job loss or other loss of income.

==== Standard or conforming mortgages ====
Many countries have a notion of standard or conforming mortgages that define a perceived acceptable level of risk, which may be formal or informal, and may be reinforced by laws, government intervention, or market practice. For example, a standard mortgage may be considered to be one with no more than 70–80% LTV and no more than one-third of gross income going to mortgage debt.

A standard or conforming mortgage is a key concept as it often defines whether or not the mortgage can be easily sold or securitized, or, if non-standard, may affect the price at which it may be sold. In the United States, a conforming mortgage is one which meets the established rules and procedures of the two major government-sponsored entities in the housing finance market (including some legal requirements). In contrast, lenders who decide to make nonconforming loans are exercising a higher risk tolerance and do so knowing that they face more challenge in reselling the loan. Many countries have similar concepts or agencies that define what are "standard" mortgages. Regulated lenders (such as banks) may be subject to limits or higher-risk weightings for non-standard mortgages. For example, banks and mortgage brokerages in Canada face restrictions on lending more than 80% of the property value; beyond this level, mortgage insurance is generally required.

==== Foreign currency mortgage ====
In some countries with currencies that tend to depreciate, foreign currency mortgages are common, enabling lenders to lend in a stable foreign currency, whilst the borrower takes on the currency risk that the currency will depreciate and they will therefore need to convert higher amounts of the domestic currency to repay the loan.

== Repaying the mortgage ==
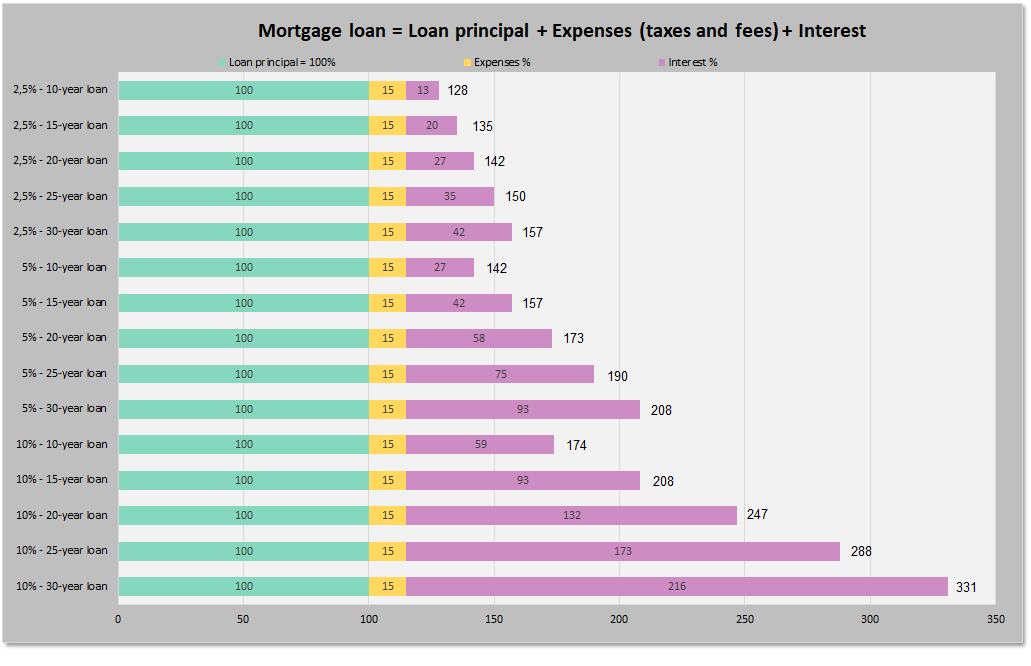
Mortgage loan. Total payment = loan principal + expenses (taxes and fees) + total interest. Fixed interest rates and loan term

In addition to the two standard means of setting the cost of a mortgage loan (fixed at a set interest rate for the term, or variable relative to market interest rates), there are variations in how that cost is paid, and how the loan itself is repaid. Repayment depends on locality, tax laws and prevailing culture. There are also various mortgage repayment structures to suit different types of borrower.

=== Principal and interest ===
The most common way to repay a secured mortgage loan is to make regular payments toward the principal and interest over a set term, commonly referred to as (self) amortization in the U.S. and as a repayment mortgage in the UK. A mortgage is a form of annuity (from the perspective of the lender), and the calculation of the periodic payments is based on the time value of money formulas. Certain details may be specific to different locations: interest may be calculated on the basis of a 360-day year, for example; interest may be compounded daily, yearly, or semi-annually; prepayment penalties may apply; and other factors. There may be legal restrictions on certain matters, and consumer protection laws may specify or prohibit certain practices.

Depending on the size of the loan and the prevailing practice in the country the term may be short (10 years) or long (50 years plus). In the UK and U.S., 25 to 30 years is the usual maximum term (although shorter periods, such as 15-year mortgage loans, are common). Mortgage payments, which are typically made monthly, contain a repayment of the principal and an interest element. The amount going toward the principal in each payment varies throughout the term of the mortgage. In the early years the repayments are mostly interest. Towards the end of the mortgage, payments are mostly for principal. In this way, the payment amount determined at outset is calculated to ensure the loan is repaid at a specified date in the future. This gives borrowers assurance that by maintaining repayment the loan will be cleared at a specified date if the interest rate does not change. Some lenders and 3rd parties offer a bi-weekly mortgage payment program designed to accelerate the payoff of the loan. Similarly, a mortgage can be ended before its scheduled end by paying some or all of the remainder prematurely, called curtailment.

An amortization schedule is typically worked out taking the principal left at the end of each month, multiplying by the monthly rate and then subtracting the monthly payment. This is typically generated by an amortization calculator using the following formula:

$$A =P\cdot\frac{r(1 + r)^n}{(1 + r)^n - 1}$$

where:

- $A$ is the periodic amortization payment
- $P$ is the principal amount borrowed
- $r$ is the rate of interest expressed as a fraction; for a monthly payment, take the (Annual Rate)/12
- $n$ is the number of payments; for monthly payments over 30 years, 12 months x 30 years = 360 payments.

=== Interest only ===
The main alternative to a principal and interest mortgage is an interest-only mortgage, where the principal is not repaid throughout the term. With this arrangement regular contributions are made to a separate investment plan designed to build up a lump sum to repay the mortgage at maturity. This type of arrangement is called an investment-backed mortgage or is often related to the type of plan used: endowment mortgage if an endowment policy is used, similarly a personal equity plan (PEP) mortgage, Individual Savings Account (ISA) mortgage or pension mortgage. Historically, investment-backed mortgages offered various tax advantages over repayment mortgages, although this is no longer the case in the UK. Investment-backed mortgages are seen as higher risk as they are dependent on the investment making sufficient return to clear the debt. Interest only mortgages have been associated with the subprime mortgage crisis.

Recent Financial Services Authority guidelines to UK lenders regarding interest-only mortgages have tightened the criteria on new lending on an interest-only basis. The problem for many people has been the fact that no repayment vehicle had been implemented, or the vehicle itself (e.g. endowment/ISA policy) performed poorly and therefore insufficient funds were available to repay balance at the end of the term. The FSA under the Mortgage Market Review (MMR) have stated there must be strict criteria on the repayment vehicle being used. As such the likes of Nationwide and other lenders have pulled out of the interest-only market.

=== Reverse mortgages ===
For older borrowers (typically in retirement), it may be possible to arrange a mortgage where neither the principal nor interest is repaid. The interest is rolled up with the principal, increasing the debt each year.

These arrangements are variously called reverse mortgages, lifetime mortgages or equity release mortgages (referring to home equity), depending on the country. The loans are typically not repaid until the borrowers are deceased, hence the age restriction.

Through the Federal Housing Administration, the U.S. government insures reverse mortgages via a program called the HECM (Home Equity Conversion Mortgage). Unlike standard mortgages (where the entire loan amount is typically disbursed at the time of loan closing) the HECM program allows the homeowner to receive funds in a variety of ways: as a one time lump sum payment; as a monthly tenure payment which continues until the borrower dies or moves out of the house permanently; as a monthly payment over a defined period of time; or as a credit line.

=== Interest and partial principal ===
In the U.S. a partial amortization or balloon loan is one where the amount of monthly payments due are calculated (amortized) over a certain term, but the outstanding balance on the principal is due at some point short of that term. In the UK, a partial repayment mortgage is quite common, especially where the original mortgage was investment-backed.

=== Variations ===
Graduated payment mortgage loans have increasing costs over time and are geared to young borrowers who expect wage increases over time. Balloon payment mortgages have only partial amortization, meaning that amount of monthly payments due are calculated (amortized) over a certain term, but the outstanding principal balance is due at some point short of that term, and at the end of the term a balloon payment is due. When interest rates are high relative to the rate on an existing seller's loan, the buyer can consider assuming the seller's mortgage. A wraparound mortgage is a form of seller financing that can make it easier for a seller to sell a property. A biweekly mortgage has payments made every two weeks instead of monthly.

Budget loans include taxes and insurance in the mortgage payment; package loans add the costs of furnishings and other personal property to the mortgage. Buydown mortgages allow the seller or lender to pay something similar to points to reduce interest rate and encourage buyers. Homeowners can also take out equity loans in which they receive cash for a mortgage debt on their house. Shared appreciation mortgages are a form of equity release. In the US, foreign nationals due to their unique situation face Foreign National mortgage conditions.

Flexible mortgages allow for more freedom by the borrower to skip payments or prepay. Offset mortgages allow deposits to be counted against the mortgage loan. In the UK there is also the endowment mortgage where the borrowers pay interest while the principal is paid with a life insurance policy.

Commercial mortgages typically have different interest rates, risks, and contracts than personal loans. Participation mortgages allow multiple investors to share in a loan. Builders may take out blanket loans which cover several properties at once. Bridge loans may be used as temporary financing pending a longer-term loan. Hard money loans provide financing in exchange for the mortgaging of real estate collateral.

=== Foreclosure and non-recourse lending ===
In most jurisdictions, a lender may foreclose the mortgaged property if certain conditions occur – principally, non-payment of the mortgage loan. Subject to local legal requirements, the property may then be sold. Any amounts received from the sale (net of costs) are applied to the original debt. In some jurisdictions, mortgage loans are non-recourse loans: if the funds recouped from sale of the mortgaged property are insufficient to cover the outstanding debt, the lender may not have recourse to the borrower after foreclosure. In other jurisdictions, the borrower remains responsible for any remaining debt.

In virtually all jurisdictions, specific procedures for foreclosure and sale of the mortgaged property apply, and may be tightly regulated by the relevant government. There are strict or judicial foreclosures and non-judicial foreclosures, also known as power of sale foreclosures. In some jurisdictions, foreclosure and sale can occur quite rapidly, while in others, foreclosure may take many months or even years. In many countries, the ability of lenders to foreclose is extremely limited, and mortgage market development has been notably slower.

Temporary immigration status can contribute to mortgage foreclosures.

== National differences ==
A study issued by the UN Economic Commission for Europe compared German, US, and Danish mortgage systems. The German Bausparkassen (savings and loans associations) reported nominal interest rates of approximately 6 per cent per annum in the last 40 years (as of 2004). Bausparkassen are not identical with banks that give mortgages. In addition, they charge administration and service fees (about 1.5 per cent of the loan amount). However, in the United States, the average interest rates for fixed-rate mortgages in the housing market started in the tens and twenties in the 1980s and have (as of 2004) reached about 6 per cent per annum. However, gross borrowing costs are substantially higher than the nominal interest rate and amounted for the last 30 years to 10.46 per cent. In Denmark, similar to the United States mortgage market, interest rates have fallen to 6 per cent per annum. A risk and administration fee amounts to 0.5 per cent of the outstanding debt. In addition, an acquisition fee is charged which amounts to one per cent of the principal.

=== United States ===
The mortgage industry of the United States is a major financial sector. The federal government created several programs, or government sponsored entities, to foster mortgage lending, construction and encourage home ownership. These programs include the Government National Mortgage Association (known as Ginnie Mae), the Federal National Mortgage Association (known as Fannie Mae) and the Federal Home Loan Mortgage Corporation (known as Freddie Mac).

The US mortgage sector has been the center of major financial crises over the last century. Unsound lending practices resulted in the National Mortgage Crisis of the 1930s, the savings and loan crisis of the 1980s and 1990s and the subprime mortgage crisis of 2007 which led to the 2010 foreclosure crisis.

In the United States, the mortgage loan involves two separate documents: the mortgage note (a promissory note) and the security interest evidenced by the "mortgage" document; generally, the two are assigned together, but if they are split traditionally the holder of the note and not the mortgage has the right to foreclose. For example, Fannie Mae promulgates a standard form contract Multistate Fixed-Rate Note 3200 and also separate security instrument mortgage forms which vary by state.

=== Canada ===
In Canada, the Canada Mortgage and Housing Corporation (CMHC) is the country's national housing agency, providing mortgage loan insurance, mortgage-backed securities, housing policy and programs, and housing research to Canadians. It was created by the federal government in 1946 to address the country's post-war housing shortage, and to help Canadians achieve their homeownership goals.

The most common mortgage in Canada is the five-year fixed-rate closed mortgage, as opposed to the U.S. where the most common type is the 30-year fixed-rate open mortgage. Throughout the subprime mortgage crisis and the ensuing recession, Canada's mortgage market continued to function well, partly due to the residential mortgage market's policy framework, which includes an effective regulatory and supervisory regime that applies to most lenders. Since the crisis, however, the low interest rate environment that has arisen has contributed to a significant increase in mortgage debt in the country.

In April 2014, the Office of the Superintendent of Financial Institutions (OSFI) released guidelines for mortgage insurance providers aimed at tightening standards around underwriting and risk management. In a statement, the OSFI has stated that the guideline will "provide clarity about best practices in respect of residential mortgage insurance underwriting, which contribute to a stable financial system." This comes after several years of federal government scrutiny over the CMHC, with former Finance Minister Jim Flaherty musing publicly as far back as 2012 about privatizing the Crown corporation.

In an attempt to cool down the real estate prices in Canada, Ottawa introduced a mortgage stress test effective 17 October 2016. Under the stress test, every home buyer who wants to get a mortgage from any federally regulated lender should undergo a test in which the borrower's affordability is judged based on a rate that is not lower than a stress rate set by the Bank of Canada. For high-ratio mortgage (loan to value of more than 80%), which is insured by Canada Mortgage and Housing Corporation, the rate is the maximum of the stress test rate and the current target rate. However, for uninsured mortgage, the rate is the maximum of the stress test rate and the target interest rate plus 2%. This stress test has lowered the maximum mortgage approved amount for all borrowers in Canada.

The stress-test rate consistently increased until its peak of 5.34% in May 2018 and it was not changed until July 2019 in which for the first time in three years it decreased to 5.19%. This decision may reflect the push-back from the real-estate industry and the introduction of the first-time home buyer incentive program (FTHBI) by the Canadian government in the 2019 Canadian federal budget. Because of all the criticisms from real estate industry, Canada finance minister Bill Morneau ordered to review and consider changes to the mortgage stress test in December 2019.

=== United Kingdom ===
The mortgage industry of the United Kingdom has traditionally been dominated by building societies, but from the 1970s the share of the new mortgage loans market held by building societies has declined substantially. Between 1977 and 1987, the share fell from 96% to 66% while that of banks and other institutions rose from 3% to 36%. (The figures have since changed further in favour of banks in part due to demutualisation.) There are currently over 200 significant separate financial organizations supplying mortgage loans to house buyers in Britain. The major lenders include building societies, banks, specialized mortgage corporations, insurance companies, and pension funds.

In the UK variable-rate mortgages are more common than in the United States. This is in part because mortgage loan financing relies less on fixed income securitized assets (such as mortgage-backed securities) than in the United States, Denmark, and Germany, and more on retail savings deposits like Australia and Spain. Thus, lenders prefer variable-rate mortgages to fixed rate ones and whole-of-term fixed rate mortgages are generally not available. Nevertheless, in recent years fixing the rate of the mortgage for short periods has become popular and the initial two, three, five and, occasionally, ten years of a mortgage can be fixed. From 2007 to the beginning of 2013 between 50% and 83% of new mortgages had initial periods fixed in this way.

Home ownership rates are comparable to the United States, but overall default rates are lower. Prepayment penalties during a fixed rate period are common, whilst the United States has discouraged their use. Like other European countries and the rest of the world, but unlike most of the United States, mortgages loans are usually not nonrecourse debt, meaning debtors are liable for any loan deficiencies after foreclosure.

The customer-facing aspects of the residential mortgage sector are regulated by the Financial Conduct Authority (FCA), and lenders' financial probity is overseen by a separate regulator, the Prudential Regulation Authority (PRA) which is part of the Bank of England. The FCA and PRA were established in 2013 with the aim of responding to criticism of regulatory failings highlighted by the 2008 financial crisis and its aftermath.

=== Continental Europe ===
Western European countries present a diversified landscape, with some countries (France, Belgium, Germany, the Netherlands, Denmark) where fixed-rate mortgages are the norm and some countries (Austria, Greece, Italy, Portugal, Spain, Sweden) favouring adjustable-rate mortgages. Much of Europe has home ownership rates comparable to the United States, but overall default rates are lower in Europe than in the United States. Mortgage loan financing relies less on securitizing mortgages and more on formal government guarantees backed by covered bonds (such as the Pfandbriefe) and deposits, except Denmark and Germany where asset-backed securities are also common. Prepayment penalties are still common, whilst the United States has discouraged their use. Unlike much of the United States, mortgage loans are usually not nonrecourse debt.

Within the European Union, covered bonds market volume (covered bonds outstanding) amounted to about €2 trillion at year-end 2007 with Germany, Denmark, Spain, and France each having outstandings above €200 billion. Pfandbrief-like securities have been introduced in more than 25 European countries—and in recent years also in the U.S. and other countries outside Europe—each with their own unique law and regulations.

==== Recent trends ====
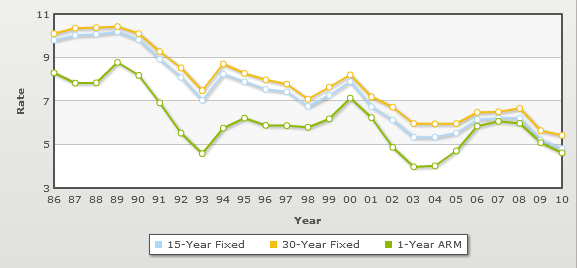
Mortgage rates historical trends 1986 to 2010

On July 28, 2008, US Treasury Secretary Henry Paulson announced that, along with four large U.S. banks, the Treasury would attempt to kick start a market for these securities in the United States, primarily to provide an alternative form of mortgage-backed securities. Similarly, in the UK "the Government is inviting views on options for a UK framework to deliver more affordable long-term fixed-rate mortgages, including the lessons to be learned from international markets and institutions".

George Soros's October 10, 2008 The Wall Street Journal editorial promoted the Danish mortgage market model.

=== Malaysia ===
Mortgages in Malaysia can be categorised into two different groups: conventional home loan and Islamic home loan. Under the conventional home loan, banks normally charge a fixed interest rate, a variable interest rate, or both. These interest rates are tied to a base rate (individual bank's benchmark rate).

For Islamic home financing, it follows the Sharia Law and comes in 2 common types: Bai’ Bithaman Ajil (BBA) or Musharakah Mutanaqisah (MM). Bai' Bithaman Ajil is when the bank buys the property at current market price and sells it back to you at a much higher price. Musharakah Mutanaqisah is when the bank buys the property together with you. You will then slowly buy the bank's portion of the property through rental (whereby a portion of the rental goes to paying for the purchase of a part of the bank's share in the property until the property comes to your complete ownership).

=== Islamic countries ===
Islamic Sharia law prohibits the payment or receipt of interest, meaning that Muslims cannot use conventional mortgages. The Islamic mortgage loan cancels any form of interest because of doctrines, so in the mortgage loan process, the lender and the borrower are more like a capital-shared partnership than a debt relationship. However, real estate is far too expensive for most people to buy outright using cash: Islamic mortgages solve this problem by having the property change hands twice. In one variation, the bank will buy the house outright and then act as a landlord. The homebuyer, in addition to paying rent, will pay a contribution towards the purchase of the property. When the last payment is made, the property changes hands.

Typically, this may lead to a higher final price for the buyers. This is because in some countries (such as the United Kingdom and India) there is a stamp duty which is a tax charged by the government on a change of ownership. Because ownership changes twice in an Islamic mortgage, a stamp tax may be charged twice. Many other jurisdictions have similar transaction taxes on change of ownership which may be levied. In the United Kingdom, the dual application of stamp duty in such transactions was removed in the Finance Act 2003 in order to facilitate Islamic mortgages.

An alternative scheme involves the bank reselling the property according to an installment plan, at a price higher than the original price.

Both of these methods compensate the lender as if they were charging interest, but the loans are structured in a way that in name they are not, and the lender shares the financial risks involved in the transaction with the homebuyer.

== Mortgage insurance ==
Mortgage insurance is an insurance policy designed to protect the mortgagee (lender) from any default by the mortgagor (borrower). It is used commonly in loans with a loan-to-value ratio over 80%, and employed in the event of foreclosure and repossession.

This policy is typically paid for by the borrower as a component to final nominal (note) rate, or in one lump sum up front, or as a separate and itemized component of monthly mortgage payment. In the last case, mortgage insurance can be dropped when the lender informs the borrower, or its subsequent assigns, that the property has appreciated, the loan has been paid down, or any combination of both to relegate the loan-to-value under 80%.

In the event of repossession, banks, investors, etc. must resort to selling the property to recoup their original investment (the money lent) and are able to dispose of hard assets (such as real estate) more quickly by reductions in price. Therefore, the mortgage insurance acts as a hedge should the repossessing authority recover less than full and fair market value for any hard asset.

== See also ==
=== General, or related to more than one nation ===
- Commercial mortgage
- Mortgage analytics
- Mortgage discrimination
- No Income No Asset (NINA)
- Nonrecourse debt
- Refinancing
- Second Mortgage

=== Related to the United Kingdom ===
- Buy to let
- Mortgage cashback
- Remortgage
- UK mortgage terminology

=== Related to the United States ===
- Commercial lender (US) – a term for a lender collateralizing non-residential properties.
- eMortgages
- FHA loan – Relating to the U.S. Federal Housing Administration
- Fixed rate mortgage calculations (USA)
- Location Efficient Mortgage – a type of mortgage for urban areas
- Mortgage assumption
- pre-approval – U.S. mortgage terminology
- pre-qualification – U.S. mortgage terminology
- Predatory mortgage lending
- VA loan – Relating to the U.S. Department of Veterans Affairs.

=== Other nations ===
- Danish mortgage market
- Hypothec - equivalent in civil law countries
- Mortgage Investment Corporation

=== Legal details ===
- Deed – legal aspects
- Mechanics lien – a legal concept
- Perfection – applicable legal filing requirements
