= Commercial mortgage =

Mortgage loan secured by commercial property

A commercial mortgage is a mortgage loan secured by commercial property, such as an office building, shopping center, industrial warehouse, or apartment complex. The proceeds from a commercial mortgage are typically used to acquire, refinance, or redevelop commercial property.

Commercial mortgages are structured to meet the needs of the borrower and the lender. Key terms include the loan amount (sometimes referred to as "loan proceeds"), interest rate, term (sometimes referred to as the "maturity"), amortization schedule, and prepayment flexibility. Commercial mortgages are generally subject to extensive underwriting and due diligence prior to closing. The lender's underwriting process may include a financial review of the property and the property owner (or "sponsor"), as well as commissioning and review of various third-party reports, such as an appraisal.

There were $3.1 trillion of commercial and multifamily mortgages outstanding in the U.S. as of June 30, 2013. Of these mortgages, approximately 49% were held by banks, 18% were held by asset-backed trusts (issuers of CMBS), 12% were held by government-sponsored enterprises and Agency and GSE-backed mortgage pools, and 10% were held by life insurance companies.

== Terms ==
=== Loan amount ===
The loan amount of a commercial mortgage is generally determined based on loan to value (LTV) and debt service coverage ratios, more fully discussed below in the section on underwriting standards.

=== Loan structure ===
Commercial mortgages can be structured as first liens or, if a greater loan amount is desired, the borrower may be able to obtain subordinate financing as well, sometimes structured as a mezzanine note or as preferred equity, which generally carries a higher interest rate.

=== Interest rate ===
Interest rates for commercial mortgages may be fixed-rate or floating rate. Fixed-rate mortgages on stabilized commercial real estate are generally priced based on a spread to swaps, with the swap spread matched to the term of the loan. Market interest rates as well as underwriting factors greatly affect the interest rate quoted on a particular piece of commercial real estate. Interest rates for commercial mortgages are usually higher than those for residential mortgages.

=== Fees ===
Many commercial mortgage lenders require an application fee or good-faith deposit, which is typically used by the lender to cover underwriting expenses such as an appraisal on the property. Commercial mortgages may also have origination or underwriting fees (paid at close as a reduction in loan proceeds) and/or exit fees (paid when the loan is repaid).

=== Term ===
The term of a commercial mortgage is generally between five and ten years for stabilized commercial properties with established cash flows (sometimes called "permanent loans"), and between one and three years for properties in transition, for example, newly opened properties or properties undergoing renovation or repositioning (sometimes called "bridge loans"). Mortgages on multifamily properties that are provided by a government-sponsored enterprise or government agency may have terms of thirty years or more. Some commercial mortgages may allow extensions if certain conditions are met, which may include payment of an extension fee. Some commercial mortgages have an "anticipated repayment date," which means that if the loan is not repaid by the anticipated repayment date, the loan is not in defaults.

=== Amortization ===
Commercial mortgages frequently amortize over the term of the loan, meaning the borrower pays both interest and principal over time, and the loan balance at the end of the term is less than the original loan amount. However, unlike residential mortgages, commercial mortgages generally do not fully amortize over the stated term, and therefore frequently end with a balloon payment of the remaining balance, which is often repaid by refinancing the property. Some commercial mortgages have an interest-only period at the beginning of the loan term during which time the borrower only pays interest.

=== Prepayment ===
Commercial loans vary in their prepayment terms, that is, whether or not a real estate investor is allowed to refinance the loan at will. Some portfolio lenders, such as banks and insurance companies, may allow prepayment flexibility. In contrast, for a borrower to prepay a conduit loan, the borrower will have to defease the bonds, by buying enough government bonds (treasuries) to provide the investors with the same amount of income as they would have had if the loan was still in place.

=== Borrower entity ===
A commercial mortgage is typically taken in by a special purpose entity such as a corporation or an LLC created specifically to own just the subject property, rather than by an individual or a larger business. This allows the lender to foreclose on the property in the event of default even if the borrower has gone into bankruptcy, that is, the entity is "bankruptcy remote".

=== Recourse ===
Commercial mortgages may be recourse or non-recourse. A recourse mortgage is supplemented by a general obligation of the borrower or a personal guarantee from the owner(s) of the property, which makes the debt payable in full even if foreclosure on the property does not satisfy the outstanding balance. A nonrecourse mortgage is secured only by the commercial property that serves as collateral. In an event of default, the creditor can foreclose on the property, but has no further claim against the borrower for any remaining deficiency.

If a sponsor is seeking financing on a portfolio of commercial real estate properties, rather than a single property, the sponsor may choose to take out a cross-collateralized loan, in which all of the properties collateralize the loan.

=== Reserves ===
Lenders may require borrowers to establish reserves to fund specific items at closing, such as anticipated tenant improvement and leasing commission (TI/LC) expense, needed repair and capital expenditure expense, and interest reserves.

== Underwriting ==
=== Underwriting metrics ===
Lenders usually require a minimum debt service coverage ratio which typically ranges from 1.1 to 1.4; the ratio is net cash flow (the income the property produces) over the debt service (mortgage payment). As an example if the owner of a shopping mall receives $300,000 per month from tenants, pays $50,000 per month in expenses, a lender will typically not give a loan that requires monthly payments above $227,273 (($300,000-$50,000)/1.1)), a 1.1 debt cover.

Lenders also look at loan to value (LTV). LTV is a mathematical calculation which expresses the amount of a mortgage as a percentage of the total appraised value. For instance, if a borrower wants $6,000,000 to purchase an office worth $10,000,000, the LTV ratio is $6,000,000/$10,000,000 or 60%. Commercial mortgage LTV's are typically between 55% and 70%, unlike residential mortgages which are typically 80% or above.

Lenders look at rents per square foot, cost per square foot and replacement cost per square foot. These metrics vary widely depending on the location and intended use of the property, but can be useful indications of the financial health of the real estate, as well as the likelihood of competitive new developments coming online.

Since the 2008 financial crisis, lenders have started to focus on a new metric, debt yield, to complement the debt service coverage ratio. Debt yield is defined as the net operating income (NOI) of a property divided by the amount of the mortgage.

=== Underwriting practices ===
Lenders typically do thorough extreme due diligence on a proposed commercial mortgage loan prior to funding the loan. Such due diligence often includes a site tour, a financial review, and due diligence on the property's sponsor and legal borrowing entity. Lenders look at credit score, bank statement, time-in-business, and annual revenue as well. Many lenders also commission and review third-party reports such as an appraisal, environmental report, engineering report, and background checks.

== Providers of commercial mortgages ==
=== Banks ===
Banks, large and small, are traditional providers of commercial mortgages. According to the Federal Reserve, banks held $1.5 trillion of commercial mortgages on their books as of June 30, 2013.

=== Conduit lenders ===
Conduit lenders originate commercial mortgages and hold them as investments for a short period of time before securitizing the loans and selling CMBS secured by the underlying commercial mortgage loans. Conduit lenders include both banks and non-bank finance companies. Approximately $560 billion of commercial mortgages were held by issuers of CMBS as of June 30, 2013, according to the Federal Reserve.

Securitization of commercial mortgages in its current form began with the Resolution Trust Corporation's (or RTC's) commercial securitization program in 1992–1997. The RTC applied an approach similar to the one it had begun successfully using with residential mortgages, issuing multiple tranches of securities secured by diversified pools of commercial mortgage loans. Following the introduction of the securitization methods by the RTC, private banks began to originate loans specifically for the purpose of turning them into securities. These loans are typically structured to forbid prepayment beyond a specified amortization schedule. This makes the resultant securities more attractive to investors, because they know that the commercial mortgages will remain outstanding even if interest rates decline.

New CMBS issuance peaked in 2007 at $229 billion. Then, the subprime mortgage crisis and the 2008 financial crisis caused CMBS prices to fall dramatically, and new issuances of CMBS securities came to a virtual halt in 2008–2009. The market has begun to recover, with $12 billion in new issuance in 2010, $37 billion in new issuance in 2011, and $48 billion in new issuance in 2012.

=== Government agencies ===
Government-sponsored enterprises such as Fannie Mae and Freddie Mac, as well as government corporations such as Ginnie Mae, are active lenders for multifamily commercial real estate (that is, apartment buildings) in the United States. Approximately $390 billion of multifamily residential mortgages were held by government-sponsored enterprises or Agency and GSE-backed mortgage pools as of June 30, 2013, representing 12% of total commercial mortgages outstanding and 43% of multifamily commercial mortgages outstanding at that time.

=== Insurance companies ===
Insurance companies are active investors in commercial mortgages, and hold approximately $325 billion of commercial mortgages as of June 30, 2013.

=== Mortgage brokers ===
Mortgage brokers do not provide commercial mortgage loans, but are often used to obtain multiple quotes from different potential lenders and to manage the financing process.

Mortgage brokers and credit advisory firms may assist borrowers with evaluating financing options and navigating property-backed lending processes. Hosen Credit is one example of a credit advisory firm operating in Israel that provides mortgage and credit consulting services.

=== Correspondent Lenders ===
Correspondent Lenders do not loan their own money, but provide front end services such as origination, underwriting, and loan servicing for lenders that utilize these types of companies. The correspondent often represents lenders in a particular geographic area.

== Other markets ==
=== United Kingdom ===
==== Commercial mortgage market ====
Analysis of HM Revenue and Customs data for property transaction completions in the United Kingdom between 2005 and 2013 shows that, unlike residential lending, mortgage lending for non-residential property was on the decline prior to the 2008–2009 global recession. Gross commercial and residential lending began picking up at a similar pace from 2009 onwards, exhibiting 16.2% and 18.2% non-inflation adjusted growth respectively between 2009 and 2013.

In 2014, commercial lending represented just 5.2% of overall gross mortgage lending by volume, but 25.3% by value. The average commercial mortgage in this year was £1.46 million, compared to the average residential mortgage of £236,400.

==== Slotting ====
Regulations introduced in 2013 by the Financial Services Authority (FSA) required banks to hold a risk-weighted amount of capital against commercial mortgages – ranging from 50% to 250% of the loan amount – in order to limit their exposure to commercial property assets. Critics predicted that the larger capital requirements for large banks could adversely affect the availability of commercial credit; however, the Bank of England's 2013 Q4 Credit Conditions Survey indicated that commercial credit availability to the corporate sector had increased throughout the year.

==== Regulation ====
As regulated mortgage contracts are defined as relating to properties that will be used “as or in connection with a dwelling by the borrower… or a related person”, individual commercial mortgage contracts and the sale thereof are not regulated by the Financial Conduct Authority (FCA). There is an exception for mixed-use properties where 40% or more of the property will be used as a dwelling. By March 2016, however, the UK will be required to have implemented new rules to comply with the pan-European Mortgage Credit Directive, which does not draw a distinction between commercial and semi-commercial properties; it is therefore currently unclear whether all mixed-use properties will be brought under FCA regulation when the new regulations take effect, irrespective of the proportion that is used for residential purposes.

==== Distinction between commercial and buy-to-let lending ====
In the UK there is a distinction between commercial mortgages, which are for the purchase of non-residential real estate, and buy-to-let mortgages, which are for the purchase of residential real estate to let out to paying tenants. Buy-to-let loans may be offered by both commercial and residential mortgage lenders.

Buy-to-let mortgages share similarities with both commercial and residential mortgages. Because of high consumer demand and the lower capital offset requirements, mortgage lenders are able to offer buy-to-let finance at typically lower interest rates than commercial mortgages. There is also a degree of regulatory crossover between the buy-to-let and residential markets, and many buy-to-let lenders employ underwriting checks similar to those prescribed by the FCA for residential mortgage applications.

Like commercial mortgages, however, buy-to-let mortgages are underwritten according to debt-service coverage rather than income multiples. High street banks might calculate DSCR at 160–170% for commercial mortgages and 125–130% for buy-to-let mortgages, while a minority of specialist lenders might calculate it at 125–130% for commercial mortgages and 110% for buy-to-let mortgages.
