= Commercial mortgage-backed security =

Type of mortgage-backed security

Commercial mortgage-backed securities (CMBS) are a type of mortgage-backed security backed by commercial and multifamily mortgages rather than residential real estate. CMBS tend to be more complex and volatile than residential mortgage-backed securities due to the unique nature of the underlying property assets.

The typical structure for the securitization of commercial real estate loans is a real estate mortgage investment conduit (REMIC), a creation of the tax law that allows the trust to be a pass-through entity which is not subject to tax at the trust level.

Many American CMBS transactions carry less prepayment risk than other MBS types, thanks to the structure of commercial mortgages. Commercial mortgages often contain lockout provisions (typically a period of 1–5 years where there can be no prepayment of the loan) which they can be subject to defeasance, yield maintenance and prepayment penalties to protect bondholders. European CMBS issues typically have less prepayment protection. Interest on the bonds may be a fixed rate or a floating rate, i.e. based on a benchmark (like LIBOR/EURIBOR) plus a spread.

== Properties and classification ==
Mortgage-backed securities can be distinguished by the type of real estate behind the collateral:

Commercial MBS (CMBS)
These are collateralized by commercial real estate (such as apartment complexes, retail and office buildings).
Residential MBS (RMBS)
These are secured by private residential real estate.

The characteristics of Commercial MBS vary depending on the term. While the longer-term loans (5 years or longer) often have fixed interest rates and restrictions on early repayments, shorter-term loans (1–3 years) usually have variable interest rates and free early repayments.

=== Distinctive Features of CMBS & RMBS ===
Commercial Mortgage-Backed Securities (CMBS) and Residential Mortgage-Backed Securities (RMBS) are distinct primarily in the underlying assets that support them. RMBS are securities backed by a home or residential apartment loan bundle, allowing investors to benefit from mortgage payments and homeowners' interest.

On the other hand, CMBS is supported by loans on commercial properties such as office buildings, retail stores, shopping centers, or other commercial spaces.It provides investors with cash flow from the income these commercial properties generate. The risk profiles and the repayment structures of these securities can differ significantly due to the nature of the residential versus commercial real estate markets.

== Industry participants ==
=== Master servicer ===
The master servicer’s responsibility is to service the loans in the pool through to maturity unless the borrower defaults. The master servicer manages the flow of payments and information and is responsible for the ongoing interaction with the performing borrower.

=== Primary servicer (or sub-servicer) ===
(Also see primary servicer) In some cases the borrower may deal with a primary servicer that may also be the loan originator or mortgage banker who sourced the loan. The primary servicer maintains the direct borrower contact, and the master servicer may sub-contract certain loan administration duties to the primary or sub-servicer.

=== Special servicer ===
(Also see special servicer) Upon the occurrence of certain specified events, primarily a default, the administration of the loan is transferred to the special servicer. Besides handling defaulted loans, the special servicer also has approval authority over material servicing actions, such as loan assumptions.

=== Directing certificate holder / controlling class / B-piece buyer ===
The most subordinate bond class outstanding at any given point is considered to be the directing certificate holder, also referred to as the controlling class. The investor in the most subordinate bond classes is commonly referred to as the "B-piece buyer". B-piece buyers generally purchase the B-rated and BB/Ba-rated bond classes along with the unrated class.

=== Trustee ===
The trustee’s primary role is to hold all the loan documents and distribute payments received from the master servicer to the bondholders. Although the trustee is typically given broad authority with respect to certain aspects of the loan under the Pooling and Servicing Agreement (PSA), the trustee typically delegates its authority to either the special servicer or the master servicer.

=== Rating agency ===
There will be as few as one and as many as four rating agencies involved in rating a securitization. Rating agencies establish bond ratings for each bond class at the time the securitization is closed. They also monitor the pool’s performance and update ratings for investors based on performance, delinquency and potential loss events affecting the loans within the trust.

== See also ==
- Residential mortgage-backed security
- Fixed income securities
- Structured finance
- Debt service coverage ratio
