= Foreign national mortgage =

Mortgage to a non-citizen

A mortgage to a non resident is called a Foreign National Mortgage loan. A foreign national who is not a resident of the United States will in many cases seek to own real estate. Financing real estate is generally done by US mortgage companies and banks to United States citizens.

Lenders also offer loans to non citizens. They may be resident aliens, temporary residents or other classifications of either temporary or permanent status.

== Down payments ==
Down payment requirements are usually higher for foreign national borrowers. The minimum down payment is usually 20% of the total purchase price of the property. This is also referred to as an 80% Loan to Value "LTV" loan.

== Foreign national credit reports ==
Lenders do prefer a credit report from the home country, but in some countries that is not possible, although some will take three credit reference letters from the borrower. The credit report is much like our own in the US but without scores as their scoring systems are different from our own. There are agencies in the US that obtain the data, conform it to US regulations and provide the background checks (verification of employment, verification of an existence of a company for self-employed) and anti-money laundering, anti-terrorism, OFAC and red flag rules. Most lenders will require 2 years of personal tax returns, copies of bank statements, proof of employment just to name a few documents and they will have to be translated. Anyone may buy and own property in the United States, regardless of citizenship.
