= Eurohypo =

Defunct German real estate bank

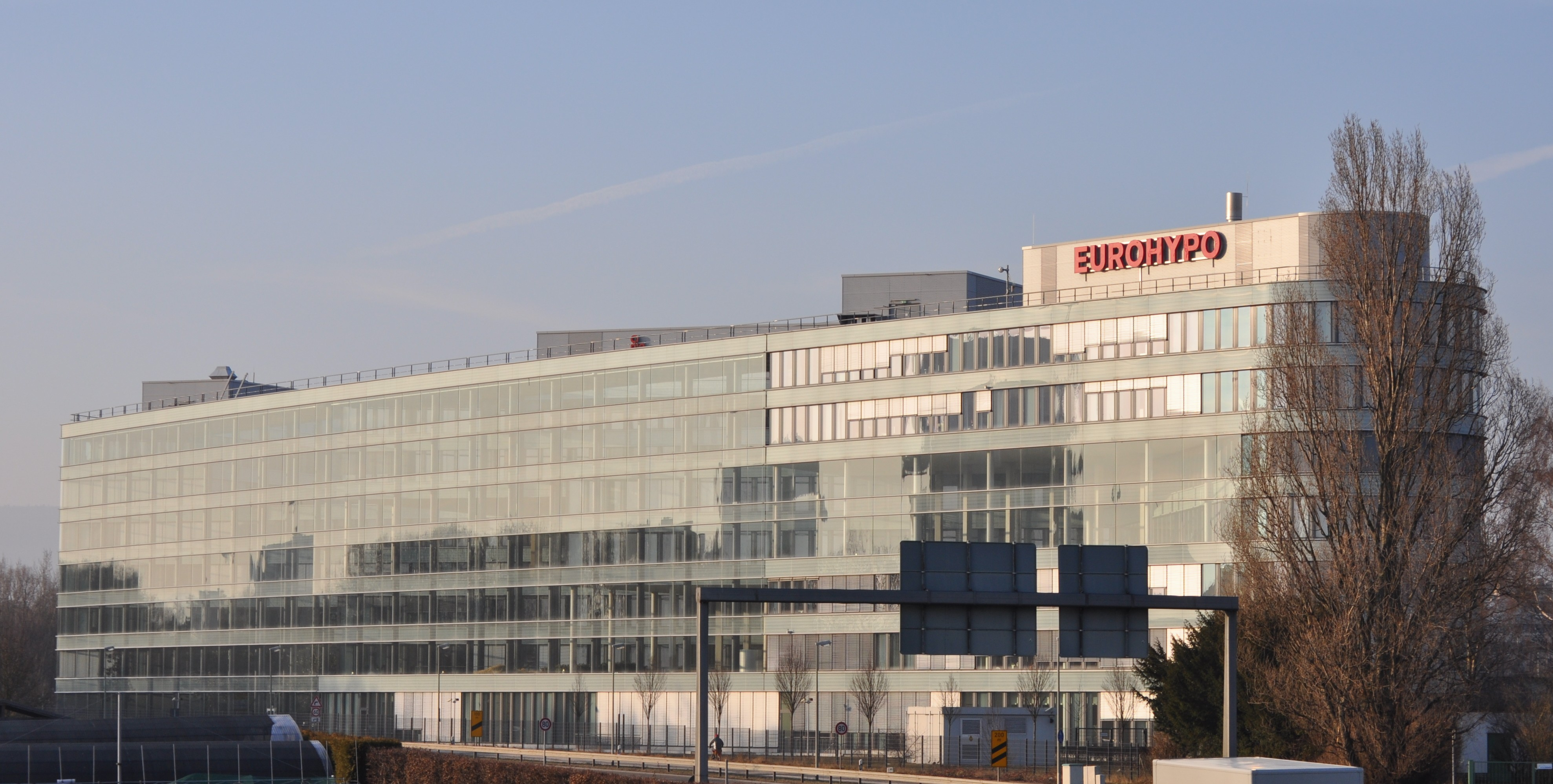
Headquarters of Eurohypo in Eschborn

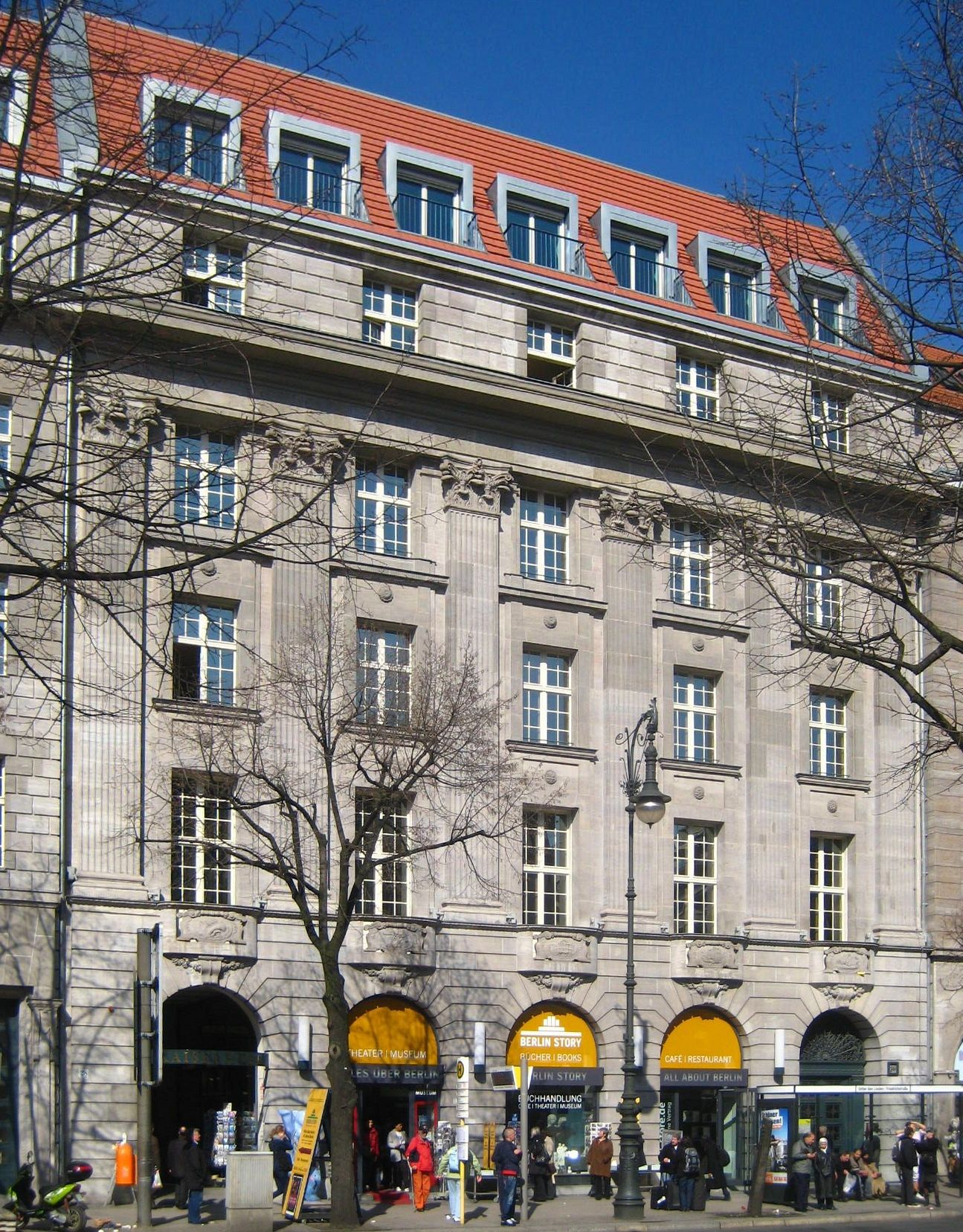
Building of the former Preußische Central-Bodenkredit-AG (later Deutsche Centralbodenkredit AG), Unter den Linden 26, in Berlin-Mitte

Hypothekenbank Frankfurt AG, previously Eurohypo AG, was wound down in 2016. Its portfolios were transferred to Commerzbank AG. The banking and pfandbrief licenses were returned and Hypothekenbank Frankfurt AG was transformed into a service company LSF Loan Solutions Frankfurt GmbH.

Hypothekenbank Frankfurt AG was a European real estate bank based in Eschborn, Frankfurt. Eurohypo was 100% owned by Commerzbank. It was the eleventh-largest bank in Germany with a balance sheet of € 214.2 billion in 2007.

Hypothekenbank Frankfurt AG (previously Eurohypo AG) is a leading international specialist bank for real estate and public finance. The bank is also the Pfandbrief issuer within the Commerzbank Group. Eurohypo’s business model is based on a common platform of real estate and public finance. Bloomberg News termed Eurohypo "problematic" and that it might be transferred to a "bad bank" within Germany's bank rescue fund SoFFin in an effort to help repair Commerzbank's capital deficit.

The Real Estate division of the company includes commercial real estate financing in Germany as well as numerous countries in Europe, the USA and Asia.

The Public Finance division covers

- Conventional public sector lending, i.e. central governments, federal states and municipalities or borrowers guaranteed by these
- Financing and consulting for public private partnership projects, as a "Centre of Competence" within the Commerzbank Group
- Pfandbrief refinancing and covered pool management

The business division Treasury is in particular responsible for:

- Fulfilment of guidelines in regards to covered pool management
- Refinance of the commercial real estate portfolio

Commercial Real Estate Lending through the credit crisis. Eurohypo has had a mixed performance during the recession.

== Background ==
Eurohypo was formed in 2003 as a subsidiary of Deutsche Bank, Dresdner Bank and Commerzbank, which agreed with each other to combine all of their real estate lending operations globally into a new bank. It was formed after all three German banks suffering years of writedowns on their real estate lending books, and having to hold greater amounts of regulatory capital against such exposures. By combining their three exposures, Eurohypo became an off-balance sheet subsidiary for all three banks, as no one shareholder had a dominant stake. It also created a bank with greater headcount and administrative overhead than any of its competitors, with none of its three main shareholders directly responsible for its strategic direction. The original intention was for Eurohypo to be listed as an independent bank on the Deutsche Boerse. In the summer of 2005, with equity markets buoyant and Dresdner Bank and Deutsche Bank keen to float Eurohypo, Commerzbank was concerned about the proposed flotation. Commerzbank's own revenues, which were largely linked to the German mid-cap corporate sector, had not recovered at the rate of the rest of the German economy, and more than 40% of its earnings came from its stake in Eurohypo. If Eurohypo would become an independent bank, Commerzbank would become a relatively easy takeover target.

Commerzbank did not wish to face being acquired by a larger bank (with the risk which that would have posed to the jobs of its own board members) - they blocked the flotation of Eurohypo and offered to buy out the stakes of Deutsche Bank and Dresdner Bank. This move, whilst certainly making Commerzbank a larger and more difficult target, was a strange one from a strategic perspective: for years Commerzbank had wanted to rid itself of its exposure to real estate lending, all of its staff who understood real estate now worked for Eurohypo, and it had lost any ability within Commerzbank to understand the direction of the real estate markets or the risks of that business. The agreements to sell the shares to Commerzbank were signed on 16 November 2005. Thus Commerzbank acquired a subsidiary, which was not only the largest Pfandbrief issuer in Europe, but had also become one of the most important players in the European securitisation business and market leader in Syndicated Loans. This exposure to riskier products, and to lending in new geographies, although much valued at the time, was to have a negative effect in later years.

The 2008 financial crisis had a material effect on Eurohypo, and started to worsen the relationship with its parent bank. With a new CEO, Frank Poerschke, parachuted in from Commerzbank, the bank announced it was going to reduce the geographies in which it lent, to a core group of USA, UK, Germany, Poland, Spain, France and Russia (called "Operation Fokus" within the bank). However, new lending activity was very limited and did not make up for the effect of the material writedowns which Eurohypo was now starting to suffer on its book, in common with other banks exposed to the real estate sector.

Its parent bank, Commerzbank, became increasingly frustrated. It did not fully understand real estate lending and had struggled to find a CEO for Eurohypo who could adequately report to it and also have a vision for the real estate lending business. Having appointed Frank Poerschke to be Eurohypo CEO in 2007, he left in mid-2011 to take a position with Jones Lang LaSalle.

Eurohypo's board was reconstituted by new board members, largely from the credit and risk function within the bank. Dr Thomas Koentgen, a former chief credit officer, was selected to be CEO. In November 2011 it became clear that Commerzbank was still struggling to understand the best way to keep the business profitable long enough to exit it. In a surprise move, the board of Eurohypo was forced to announce that it would cease lending in all countries apart from Germany for a six-month period, in order to return various capital ratios to more acceptable levels. Internally within Eurohypo this was a source of significant frustration, as client loyalty was largely a function of always being seen by the market as being open for business. In the absence of any other options, the client relationship managers within the bank did their best to convince clients that they would reopen for business on 27 June 2012.

A further surprise move would finally kill off the bank. On the night before business was due to resume, Commerzbank issued a press release stating that it would fully exit its operations in real estate lending globally, and issued notices to the Eurohypo CEO that lending operations would not resume. Commerzbank also announced that it would be exiting its ship finance business globally. This was announced to the press and the stockmarket by Commerzbank before many senior regional managers at Eurohypo had been informed.

Since June 2012, Eurohypo has been officially in wind-down, with some parts of the bank trying to create an auction for regional loan books, such as the one in the UK. Some observers have commented that such an auction is unlikely to succeed as Commerzbank has an over-inflated view of the value of the loan books, and has no motivation to accept a reduced value. Some market commentators have also viewed the attempted sale of the "UK management platform"as being driven by certain senior staff at the London branch, rather than by Commerzbank, and therefore equally unlikely to succeed. Most new entrants to the lending market in the UK, such as Starwood Capital, AIG and Venn Partners have hired a small team of specialists rather than the entire team of one of the former big property lenders. With Eurohypo's London branch relatively top-heavy, significant pruning of expensive staff would be needed by a new owner.

== See also ==
- List of banks in Germany
