= Association of German Pfandbrief Banks =

- Verband deutscher Pfandbriefbanken
- Abbreviation: vdp
- Type: Trade association
- Legal status: Eingetragener Verein (registered association)
- Purpose: Represent German Pfandbrief banks
- Location: Berlin, Germany
- Region served: Germany
- Members: 40 (2020)
- Official language: German
- President: Gero Bergmann
- Website: www.pfandbrief.de
- Formerly called: Verband deutscher Hypothekenbanken

The Association of German Pfandbrief Banks (German: Verband deutscher Pfandbriefbanken), abbreviated vdp, is the interest group of German banks which issue a form of property-backed covered bond known as Pfandbrief. vdp member institutions are also engaged in ship and aircraft finance. The vdp takes the judicial form of an Eingetragener Verein (registered association).

== History ==
The association was named Verband deutscher Hypothekenbanken (lit. 'association of German mortgage banks') until July 2005.

== Organization ==
The association represents 40 member institutions and it is one of the five members of the German Banking Industry Committee that is defining the standards of the German financing sector.

The bond banks association runs a number of subsidiaries for specialized task such as the "vdp Research GmbH" (vdpResearch), the "vdp Pfandbriefakademie GmbH" (Pfandbrief Academy), the "Hyp Real Estate Rating Services GmbH" (HypRating) and the "Hyp-Zert-Gesellschaft" that is certifying real estate agents to take part in the "Beleihungswertermittlungen mbH" (HypZert - mortgage estimates), with all of them located in Berlin.
