= Mortgage analytics =

Mortgage analytics is defined as an array of analysis—organized by market and product—which provides insight into how pricing strategy and market conditions will affect mortgage volume and demand. Analytic reports include market response, price elasticity and general sensitivity studies seen both at the firm and market levels.

Mortgage analytics experts use several types of data resources to create customized reports for their clients, commonly banks and lenders who seek up-to-date mortgage data in order to set appropriate loan rates and fees for borrowers. These data resources include records of delinquency rates, dealer loss information estimates, trend analysis, automated property valuation, property tax delinquency and other loan-level data sets like lock-loan volume reports and lender-based loan fee reports.

== See also ==
- Commercial mortgage
- No Income No Asset (NINA)
- Nonrecourse debt
- Refinancing
- Second Mortgage
