= Participation mortgage =

Type of mortgage loan

A participation mortgage or participating mortgage is a mortgage loan, or sometimes a group of them, in which two or more persons have fractional equitable interests. In this arrangement the lender, or mortgagee, is entitled to share in the rental or resale proceeds from a property owned by the borrower, or mortgagor. The mortgage is evidenced by the bank or other fiduciary that has legal title to the mortgage and sells the fractional shares to investors or makes the investment for the certificate holders. A participation mortgage may or may not require principal and interest payments and may or may not contain a balloon payment.

For instance, John has a loan for a strip mall including six separate units. All are rented/leased and in addition to the principal and interest he pays to the lender, he is required to pay a certain percentage of the incoming funds. The lender is then participating in the income stream provided by the particular property.
