= Capital Services Group =

- Company type: Private
- Industry: Financial services
- Founded: September 24, 1998
- Headquarters: Tokyo, Japan
- Area served: Japan, Thailand, Singapore, Malaysia, Taiwan, U.S.
- Key people: Carl Everett, CEO
- Products: Loan Servicing, Real Estate Asset Management
- Website: www.capserv.com

Capital Services Group (CSG) is an independent asset management firm established in 1998. Its flagship operation is in Tokyo, Japan, with offices in Thailand, Singapore, Malaysia, Taiwan and the U.S.

== Loan servicing platform ==
CSG’s primary business includes special servicing of non-performing loans (NPL) and primary servicing for commercial and residential mortgage loans portfolios including CMBS and RMBS.

CSG’s servicing operations have been rated by multiple independent agencies since 2001 in Japan, and 2007 in Thailand. Capital’s Japan servicing operation has been the highest rated in Japan by Fitch Ratings for special servicing (CSS1-) since 2007, and it has also been rated by Standard & Poor’s ("S&P") as a commercial loan primary servicer and residential loan primary servicer. Capital‘s Thailand servicing operation has been rated as a residential special servicer by Fitch and is to date the only servicer in Thailand to be rated by any agency.

== Real estate platform ==
CSG provides real estate asset management, investment advisory, acquisition support, brokerage and portfolio management services specializing in commercial, residential, and hospitality asset classes. It has extensive experience in asset management for major hotels and serviced apartments in locations throughout Japan, Thailand, Singapore, and Guam.

== History ==
Capital Servicing Co., Ltd., the first and largest operation of the Capital Services Group is based in Tokyo, and obtained servicer license no. 23 from the Japanese Ministry of Justice in September 1999. Capital Servicing initially commenced operations as a special servicer, focusing on asset work-out for non-performing loan portfolios for U.S. investment banks, but as the Japanese distressed debt markets matured, it developed its primary servicing and real estate asset management functions shortly thereafter.

In 2000, CSG established its first operation in South East Asia in Bangkok, Thailand and has since operated companies throughout the region.
