= National Mortgage Crisis of the 1930s =

American economic crisis

The National Mortgage Crisis of the 1930s was a Depression-era crisis in the United States characterized by high-default rates and soaring loan-to-value ratios in the residential housing market. Rapid expansion in the residential non-farm housing market through the 1920s created a housing bubble inflated in part by ad hoc innovation on the part of the four primary financial intermediaries – commercial banks, life insurance companies, mutual savings banks, and Building & Loans (thrifts). As a result, the federal overhaul stemming from New Deal legislation gave rise to a paradigmatic shift in mortgage lending, popularizing longer-term maturity, fully amortizing mortgages and creating a thick secondary market for mortgage-related securities.

== Pre-crash lending policies ==
Lending was dominated by four financial intermediaries – commercial banks, life insurance companies, mutual savings banks, and thrifts (also called Savings and Loan Associations, or S&Ls) – though only life insurance companies operated interregionally. Mutual savings banks and commercial banks held commanding market shares in specific regions – New England and Mid-Atlantic cities, and in the West, respectively – but were limited elsewhere. Thrifts, by contrast, expanded to all corners of the country by the end of the 1920s, but functioned predominantly on the local level.

In addition to their geographic range of influence, the four intermediaries differed in their preferred mortgage terms. Commercial banks, life insurance companies, and mutual savings banks typically offered 5-year balloon mortgages at a loan-to-value ratio of 50%. As with any bubble environment, borrowers and lenders alike expected asset prices to rise ad infinitum and tended to continually refinance at maturity, exposing themselves to the clear danger of default and resulting institutional insolvency in the event of tightened credit.

S&Ls, on the other hand, tended to offer 11 to 12 year fully amortizing mortgages, and would generally write mortgages with loan-to-value ratios well in excess of 50%. Borrowers thus faced a decision: accept high payments in return for eventual outright ownership or preference short-term well-being over formal home ownership. Many adopted a hybrid, financing 50% of the purchase price (less down payment) with an interest-only balloon loan and covering the remainder with an amortizing mortgage from a thrift, eventually financing the obligation at maturity of the former (perhaps after rolling it over for several periods) with an amortizing loan, and in so doing extending the term to maturity of this hybrid while at the same time putting forth a smaller down payment (the combined value of the mortgages exceeds an individual mortgage that an individual would qualify for). This hybrid was termed the “Philadelphia Plan” by W. N. Loucks in 1928 in reference to where its use first became widespread.

Though all unique in term structure, each of these three financing instruments – two pure and one hybrid – were at risk of failure. The 12 year fully amortizing mortgage was perhaps the best option, but represented a substantial monthly obligation for the retail borrower even in the status quo, and thus an unmeetable one in the event of an acute economic crisis. The Philadelphia Plan and the pure 5-year balloon mortgage both presented the borrower with a lesser monthly obligation, but were predicated upon the assumption of freely available credit with which to refinance the principal at maturity which exposed them to substantial risk of default under an acute financial crisis characterized by tightening credit.

== The Great Depression and subsequent modernization of the mortgage market ==
The stock market crash on Black Tuesday and subsequent economic turmoil reified the formerly abstract risks endemic to the 1920s mortgage market: borrowers could no longer afford even moderate monthly payments and the recompense afforded by foreclosure on a lien did little to ameliorate many institutions' financial standing: between 1928 and 1933, home prices declined by nearly 25.9%, including an annual dip of 10.5% in 1932. As a result, many intermediaries failed, particularly S&Ls which had been operating their own Philadelphia Plans – issuing both the balloon and amortizing mortgages – the latter under a share accumulation loan plan whereby borrowers were required to buy shares in the S&L each period until their holdings were at par with the amortizing loan principal at which point the debt was canceled. Default increased effective loan balances for remaining borrowers by reducing the value of the sinking fund, further incentivizing default by other borrowers, and many S&Ls were forced to liquidate their holdings in whole – some 5,000 throughout the 1930s. While somewhat more muted because they were not subject to the woes of a share accumulation plan, other major financial intermediaries experienced a similar plight.

In 1934, as part of the New Deal, Congress passed the National Housing Act of 1934, which created two new agencies: (1) the Federal Housing Administration (FHA), which insured mortgages that met specific criteria, and (2) the Federal Savings and Loan Insurance Corporation (FSLIC), which insured deposits at S&Ls (and which failed during the Savings and Loan Crisis) of the 1980s and 1990s. Both were focused on shoring up the housing market by availing more credit, thereby thickening the market and stabilizing home prices. The FHA went one step further, and set restrictions on the terms and interest rates of qualifying mortgages, typically requiring fully amortizing mortgages to carry terms to maturity in excess of 15 years, with interest rates exceeding 5% annually in only isolated cases. The structure of these new mortgages mitigates much of the risk inherent to pre-crash instruments.

== Aftermath ==
Beginning with the advent of the FHA, loan-to-value ratios steadily increased, alleviating the need for borrowers to hold multiple mortgages as was the case with the Philadelphia Plan. In a continuing effort to thicken the residential mortgage market, the Federal Government created the Federal National Mortgage Association (FNMA, or Fannie Mae), which purchased mortgages issued under the auspices of the FHA in order to create a large secondary market for residential mortgages. The FHA applied increasingly stringent terms as time progressed, and by the 1950s many mortgages had increased terms to some 30 years, which has since become the industry standard.
