= Recognizance =

Pledge of money in common law

In some common law nations, a recognizance is a conditional pledge of money made by a person before a court. If a person breaks the conditions upon which they were released on their own recognizance, they or their sureties will forfeit the money pledged. It is an obligation of record, entered into before a court or magistrate duly authorized, whereby the party bound acknowledges (recognizes) that they owe a personal debt to the state. A recognizance is subject to a "defeasance"; that is, the obligation will be avoided if the person bound does some particular act, such as appearing in court on a particular day or keeping the peace. In criminal cases the concept is used as a form of bail both when a person has been charged but not tried and when a person has been found guilty at trial as an incentive not to commit further misconduct. The concept of a recognizance exists in Australia, Canada, Hong Kong, the Republic of Ireland, and the United States. Recognizances were frequently used by courts of quarter sessions; for example, they make up more than 70% of surviving records of the Bedfordshire quarter sessions.

== Bail ==
A recognizance is a form of bail, in which an accused is released from pre-trial detention with an incentive to ensure that they will appear before the court to face charges on a certain day in the future. A person may be required to provide sureties, being another person who will guarantee the attendance of the accused and agree to forfeit the amount if they do not. If a person is not required to provide a surety, they are released "on their own recognizance". Release on recognizance is sometimes abbreviated as RoR, OR (own recognizance, particularly in the United States), or PR (personal recognizance).

A recognizance is different from a bail bond in that it is a pledge of money and no upfront payment of a cash deposit is required.

Historically in England, recognizances were also used by courts of quarter sessions to require a person to attend court and give evidence.

== As an incentive not to commit further misconduct ==
Where a person has been found guilty at trial, a court may release the defendant on their own recognizance, as an incentive for the person not to commit further offences. In 1733, John Harper was released from Bridewell on his own recognizance. They were used by courts of quarter sessions to keep the peace and for people to be of good behaviour, with the person required to attend the quarter sessions once every year until tensions had cooled.

They continue to be used for this purpose in Australia, with the federal Crimes Act providing that the court can discharge the person with or without sureties, by recognizance or otherwise. The discharge can include conditions such as to be of good behaviour or to pay compensation. A recognizance release order may involve the immediate release of the person into the community or after serving a specified period of time. For example the New South Wales Court of Criminal Appeal upheld the sentence imposed on John Khoo for insider trading offences that he be imprisoned for 1 year and 11 months, but be released after 14 months on entering a recognisance to be of good behaviour.
