= Kensington Gardens Apartment Complex =

- U.S. National Register of Historic Places
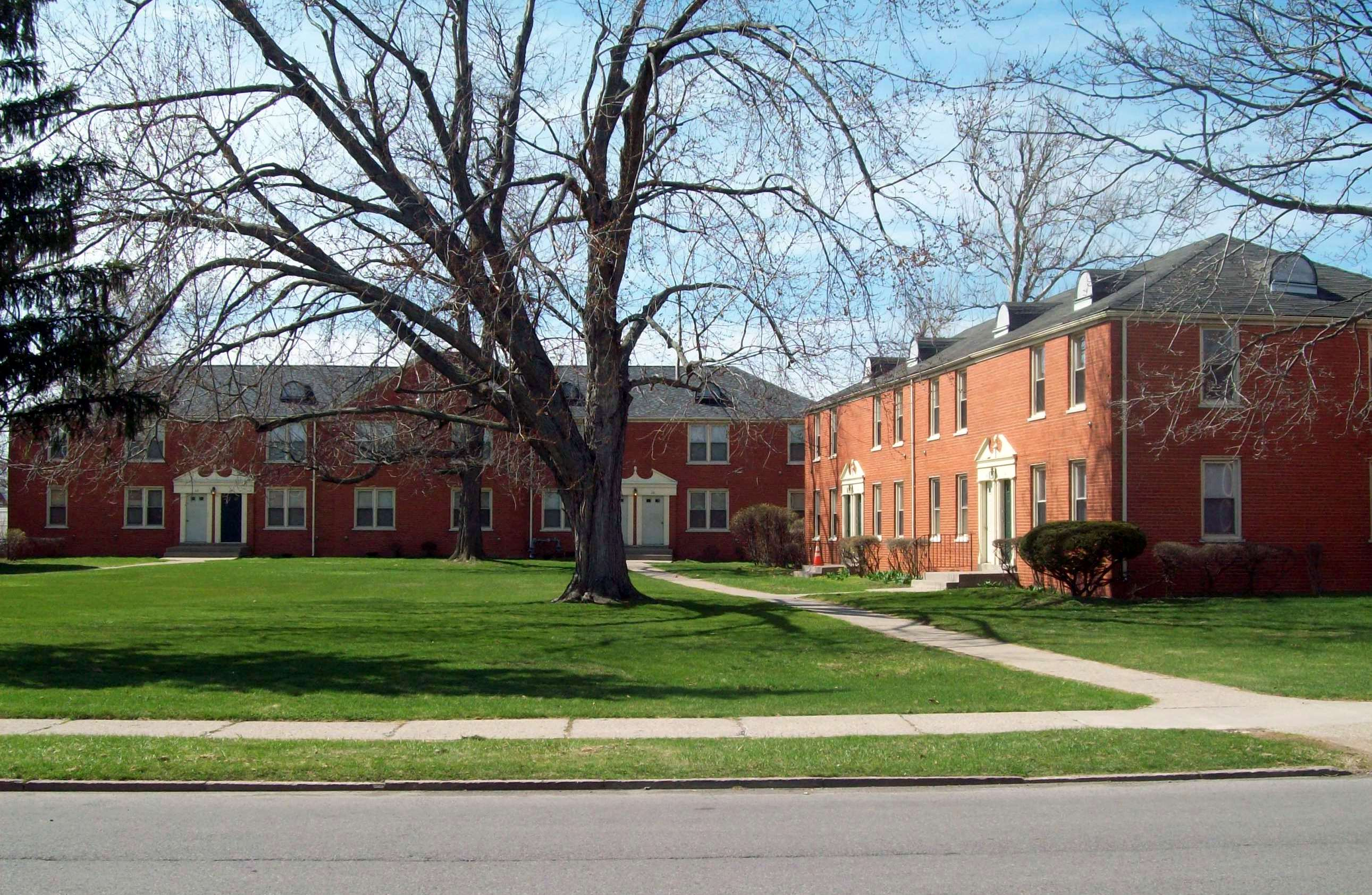
- Kensington Gardens Apartment Complex, April 2011

- Location within New York Location within the United States
- Location: 1, 2, 3 W. Cleveland Dr., Buffalo, New York
- Coordinates: 42°56′30″N 78°47′59″W
- Area: 20.83 acres (8.43 ha)
- Built: 1941
- Architect: Godfrey Weinstein and William I. Hohasuer Architecture and Engineering
- Architectural style: Colonial Revival
- NRHP reference No.: 10000989
- Added to NRHP: December 17, 2010

Kensington Gardens Apartment Complex is a historic apartment complex located at Buffalo in Erie County, New York. It was built in 1941–1942 and is a multi-unit apartment complex containing a total of 280, one-, two- and three-bedroom apartments in a variety of detached and semi-attached buildings in the Colonial Revival style. The 59 contributing buildings are grouped around grassed courts. There are 10 court areas created on the site and three building types within the courts. It is an example of a World War II-era worker housing community built with financing by the Federal Housing Administration (FHA).

It was listed on the National Register of Historic Places in 2010.
