= Mortgage industry of Denmark =

The mortgage industry of Denmark provides borrowers with flexible and transparent loans on conditions close to the funding conditions of capital market players. Simultaneously, the covered mortgage bonds transfer market risk from the issuing mortgage bank to bond investors. Lastly, strict property appraisal rules, credit risk management by the mortgage banks, and tight regulations including the so-called 'balance principle', have also historically shielded mortgage bonds from default risk. High industry concentration and automatic stabilizers also play a role in maintaining stability.

In Denmark, the mortgage banks are the only financial institutions allowed to grant loans against mortgage on real property by issuing covered mortgage bonds (Danish: Realkreditobligationer). The scope of activities allowed to mortgage banks is limited to the origination and servicing of mortgage loans, their funding, exclusively through the issuance of mortgage bonds, and activities deemed accessory. As of 2007, there are eight mortgage banks active in the Danish mortgage market, some affiliated with commercial banks.

== General ==
=== The "balance principle" ===
The Danish Mortgage Credit Act imposes strict matching rules between the assets (e.g., mortgage loans) and the liabilities (e.g., mortgage bonds) of mortgage credit institutions. Each new loan is in principle funded by the issuance of new mortgage bonds of equal size and identical cash flow and maturity characteristics, dubbed the balance principle or, in, the balanced book principle (p. 29). The proceeds from the sale of the bonds are passed to the borrower and similarly, interest and principal payments are passed directly to investors holding mortgage bonds. Moreover, the Mortgage Credit Act establishes strict lending rules which differ depending on the type of property financed. Maximum loan to value (LTV) ratios and lending periods are set up for each category of property. While for all categories of properties, the maximum lending period can be up to 30 years, maximum lending limits differ significantly according to the nature of the mortgaged property. For owner-occupied homes, rental properties, cooperative homes and housing projects, mortgage loans can represent up to 80 percent of the value of the property. In contrast, maximum LTV ratios are limited to 70 percent for agricultural properties, 60 percent for commercial real estate and secondary residences, and 40 percent for un-built sites.

The first Danish Mortgage Act was passed in 1850, establishing new mortgage credit institutions which were cast as (non-profit) associations. Loans against mortgages on real property are financed by issuing bonds in series. Initially, borrowers were jointly liable for the liabilities of the corresponding pool of mortgages. The system kept evolving thereafter, in particular in the early 1970s, when mortgage financing was simplified and standardized. The last major round of reform took place in 1989, among others authorizing commercial banks to own mortgage credit institutions. After 2001, the majority of mortgage bonds were issued without the joint liability of borrowers.

=== Property registration and the granting of a loan ===
A mortgage system depends on the effective registration of property units and rights in land. The cadastre, maintained by the National Survey and Cadastre, identifies each land parcel and property unit. The identification is used by other national information systems. The Land Registration Court handles registration of titles to land, mortgages and other charges. The mortgage banks grant a loan only on condition that the mortgage deed is registered, but without any other type of security. Also, a very detailed credit check isn't done on the borrower; the collateral of the loan is the property, rather than the borrower. The details of the process of setting up a mortgage loan are described in English. The Municipalities of Denmark maintain information systems, recording among others zoning, building construction details and taxable value, and the tax authorities maintain a mass appraisal system. Both latter systems are updated through compulsory abstracting of title deeds, collected through the municipalities.

=== Foreclosure ===
In the event of non-payment of its mortgage-related obligations by the mortgagor, the mortgage bank may put the property up for a forced sale. Forced sales are carried through by enforcement courts (Fogedretten), which are part of the ordinary system of courts. Mortgagees will be covered in order of priority and while uncovered mortgage loans will be deleted from the Land Register, the mortgagees will keep their (uncovered) claim against the borrower as a personal claim. It typically takes no more than six months from the time when the borrower defaults on the loan until a forced sale can be carried through. This is in contrast with France, say, where it can take several years to foreclose.

The human costs of turning a family into the street are mitigated through social housing. Denmark has a total housing stock of 2.5 million housing units, of which 19 per cent belong to social housing associations. The associations are subsidised by the government and municipalities in terms of reduced interest and mortgage repayments and loan guarantees. Also the residents - as in other rented housing - receive individual rent subsidies related to income, size of household and size of apartment. People in acute need of housing can turn to the municipality for help if they are without possibilities to solve their own housing problem. Foreclosure is mentioned as a cause among other causes, e.g. divorce, cf. page 59 in

98% of Danish mortgages are securitized to mortgage-backed securities and sold by the mortgage originators.

== Business ==
=== Process walk-through ===
- Mortgage banks which obtain application data and review documentation and appraisals of originators who propose mortgages.
- Each mortgage bank, every day, issues new bonds valued at one cent each into an existing bond pool in an amount equivalent to the new loans it makes that day. The money manager of the mortgage institute decides when to sell the new bonds into the secondary market since they are identical to other bonds in the same series.
- In event of a rise or drop in interest rates, a new bond pool may be started at a rate ½ percent different than its predecessor, but the yields are equivalent.
- The bond prices trade and are quoted at day end and there is inter day pricing. The amount of cash transferred by the mortgage institute to the originator (borrower) is based on the number of bonds issued and their previous day’s quote.
- Every time a loan balance is reduced, an equivalent number of bonds are identified by lottery and converted into a different bond also with a one cent par value (that will convert at par into cash at the next payment date). This and the fact that originally bonds issued equal the full amount of the loan, enforce the Balance Principle.
- Loan prepayments can be made by using cash with some advance notice requirements so the bond market can anticipate what is coming. In effect a contract is made in advance that the cash presented will be used for prepayment at the next payment date.
- Loans can also be prepaid using bonds. These bonds can be purchased at a discount if that’s where they are trading, and receive prepayment credit at par. Loan prepayments in bonds require presentation of bonds from the series that funded the loan. Bond investors do not see loan prepayments with bonds to be a prepayment at all since the bonds eliminated due to the prepayment do not include any bonds being held by the investor.

=== Costs ===
A study issued by the UN Economic Commission for Europe compared German, US, and Danish mortgage systems. The German Bausparkassen have reported nominal interest rates of approximately 6 per cent per annum in the last 40 years (as of 2004). In addition, they charge administration and service fees (about 1.5 per cent of the loan amount). In the United States, the average interest rates for fixed-rate mortgages in the housing market started in high double figures in the 1980s and have (as of 2004) reached about 6 per cent per annum. However, gross borrowing costs are substantially higher than the nominal interest rate and amounted for the last 30 years to 10.46 per cent. In Denmark, similar to the United States capital market, interest rates have fallen to 6 per cent per annum. A risk and administration fee amounts to 0.5 per cent of the outstanding debt. In addition, an acquisition fee is charged which amounts to one per cent of the principal, p. 46 in.

== See also ==
- Government sponsored enterprise
- Mortgage loan
