= Primary servicer =

Term for companies that monitor and manage loans

The term primary servicer refers to companies that monitor and manage loans. The primary servicer of a loan can be the loan originator, the mortgage banker or a third party and maintains direct contact with the borrower. If the loan falls into default or needs special attention, a special servicer would undertake this role.

== The role of a primary servicer ==
- Analysing the borrower’s financial situation for example reviewing financial statements and business plans and monitoring their performance against their business plans.
- Analysing and monitoring the assets on which the loan is secured by regular visits to the property for inspection as well as reviewing lease agreements, management terms and tenant covenant strength.

== Mortgage servicing volumes ==
The latest Mortgage Bankers Association end of year survey shows the top CMBS servicers and servicing volumes within the industry.

Total C/MF Loans Secured by Collateral OUTSIDE the US as of December 31, 2010

Rank	Company	Amount ($ millions)	Number of Loans	Average Loan Size ($m)
1	Hatfield Philips International, an LNR Company	$28,756	194	$148.2
2	Deutsche Bank Commercial Real Estate	$24,845	169	$147.0
3	PNC Real Estate / Midland Loan Services	$11,541	1,461	$7.9
4	GEMSA Loan Services LP	$9,649	565	$17.1
5	Manulife Financial / John Hancock	$8,770	1,890	$4.6
6	Capital Services Group	$4,238	3,941	$1.1
7	Berkadia Commercial Mortgage LLC	$2,359	169	$14.0
8	LNR Partners Germany, an LNR Property Company	$1,022	543	$1.9
9	Bank of America (Merrill Lynch)	$867	31	$28.0
10	TriMont Real Estate Advisors	$748	45	$16.6
11	Pacific Life Insurance Company	$519	20	$26.0
12	Prudential Asset Resources	$334	12	$27.9
13	The Bank of New York Mellon - Asset Solutions Division	$78	30	$2.6
