= Pfandbrief =

The Pfandbrief (plural: Pfandbriefe), a mostly triple-A rated German bank debenture, has become the blueprint of many covered bond models in Europe and beyond. The Pfandbrief is collateralized by long-term assets such as property mortgages or public sector loans as stipulated in the Pfandbrief Act. Total volume outstanding in Pfandbriefe was EUR 806 billion as at end-2008. Pfandbrief bonds make up the third largest segment of the German bond market after public sector bonds and unsecured bank debt.

A survey of European Pfandbrief-like products was issued in 2005 by the Bank for International Settlements; the International Monetary Fund in 2007 issued a study of the covered bond markets in Germany and Spain, while the European Central Bank in 2003 issued a study of housing markets, addressing also mortgage markets and providing a two-page overview of current mortgage systems in the EU countries.

== History ==
The roots of the German Pfandbrief system reach back to the year 1769. In the aftermath of the Seven Years' War (1756–1763) that had ravaged the country Prussian King Frederick the Great introduced the Pfandbrief system with a ”cabinets-order” to ease credit shortage for the nobility. Based on his royal decree, Prussia set up so-called ”Landschaften,” compulsory public-law associations of noble landowners, within the individual provinces. To refinance loans to their members Landschaften issued debentures that largely correspond with the present-day mortgage Pfandbrief since the creditor acquired a direct claim over the estates the member had pledged as security. This Pfandbrief system rapidly spread throughout all of Europe. Towards the end of the nineteenth century, it was widely adopted for the refinancing of public sector loans. The second decisive boost to the development of the Pfandbrief occurred when Landschaften outside Prussia started issuing Pfandbriefe for which all the properties lent against by the Landschaft served jointly as security. As before the loans raised by the Landschaften were not paid out in cash, but in Pfandbriefe. In 1862, the first German mortgage bank, Frankfurter Hypothekenbank in Frankfurt am Main, opened its doors. Numerous other mortgage banks followed in rapid succession in almost all German federal states. By the beginning of the twentieth century 40 private mortgage banks existed. Mortgage banks concentrated from the outset on real estate financing. The rapidly expanding towns and cities in the area of industrialization were in need of the housing construction and commercial properties financing. The 1900 Mortgage Bank Act (HBG) is deemed pioneering legislation until today. It provided a legally prescribed, uniform organizational framework for this group of credit institutions. It was in force for more than a century until the Pfandbrief Act entered into force in 2005 (source: Association of German Pfandbrief Banks).

== German Pfandbrief legislation ==
The Pfandbrief Act (Pfandbriefgesetz), established in 2005 and amended in 2009, regulates the Pfandbrief. While most European countries have covered bond legislation, the United States and UK initially preferred non-legislative guidelines. The 2005 Pfandbrief Act increased potential issuers to include all licensed credit institutions that meet certain requirements. Formerly, only specialized private mortgage banks and public sector banks could issue covered bonds in Germany. The Pfandbrief Act supersedes all prior existing Pfandbrief legislations. The 2009 amendment introduced the Aircraft Pfandbrief as the fourth Pfandbrief type.

== Pfandbrief characteristics ==
In their cover business, Pfandbrief banks grant property finance, public sector, ship and aircraft loans. Pfandbriefe have an average maturity of about five to seven years. While Pfandbriefe tend to be associated with asset-backed securities they are fundamentally different. Pfandbrief cover-assets remain on the bank's balance sheet. By contrast, asset-backed securities are typically off-balance-sheet transactions. Another difference: Pfandbrief cover pools are dynamic. Their composition can and usually does change over time, depending on the maturities and on the newly registered cover assets. Due to the stringent legal provisions that govern their issuance Pfandbriefe are deemed particularly safe. An independent cover pool trustee appointed by the Federal Financial Supervisory Authority (BaFin) records cover assets and cover asset replacements in the cover register. In the event of the Pfandbrief issuer's insolvency, Pfandbrief investors have a preferential claim on the cover assets in the cover register because cover pool assets are not included in insolvency proceedings. There has not been a Pfandbrief default since 1901. Property financings may be included in the cover pool only up to 60% of the prudently calculated mortgage lending value. The same holds true for ship and aircraft financings. Public sector loans are 100% eligible for cover.

== The German covered bond market ==
Pfandbrief issuers use pfandbriefe to fund loans that are secured by real estate liens, ship or aircraft mortgages or claims against public-sector bodies. Depending on the type of collateralization, these bonds are referred to as Mortgage Pfandbrief (Hypothekenpfandbrief), Public Pfandbrief (Öffentlicher Pfandbrief), Ship Pfandbrief (Schiffspfandbrief) or Aircraft Pfandbrief (Flugzeugpfandbrief). Pfandbrief issuers have three different pfandbrief segments at their disposal: Jumbo pfandbriefe, traditional pfandbriefe and registered pfandbriefe. For the actual placement issuers have the choice between private placements and public offering. With a volume outstanding of EUR 806 billion, the Pfandbrief held a leading place in the European bond markets at year-end 2008. Pfandbriefe made up 22 percent of the German bond market in 2008: 71.9 percent of pfandbriefe were public pfandbriefe, 27.0% Mortgage Pfandbriefe and 1.1% Ship Pfandbriefe. The first Aircraft Pfandbriefe were expected to be issued in 2010.

Pfandbrief-like securities have been introduced in more than 25 European countries—and in recent years also in the United States of America and other countries outside Europe—each with their own unique law and regulations. Today, continental Europe's covered bond market is well established. Initially primarily used to refinance residential mortgages it evolved as a means to finance public sector loans and ship mortgages over time. (source: German Association of Pfandbrief Banks). The global covered bond market volume (covered bonds outstanding) amounted to EUR 2.1 trillion at year-end 2007. Percentage by country: Germany: 42%, Denmark: 16%, Spain: 13%, France: 10%, Sweden: 4%, United Kingdom: 4%, Ireland: 3%, Luxembourg: 2%, Switzerland: 1%, Austria: 1%, Netherlands: 1%, United States: 1%, other: 3%.

== Jumbo Pfandbrief ==
The Jumbo Pfandbrief, first brought to market in 1995, arose from a need to attract international investors to a market that had been largely of domestic interest. Instead of individual banks placing large-volume issues, the Jumbo Pfandbrief allows an issuing syndicate with the goal of marketing Jumbo Pfandbrief issues and of subsequently ensuring market making. A Jumbo Pfandbrief must have a minimum issuance volume of EUR 1 billion. The average issue size of a Jumbo Pfandbrief is about EUR 1.5 billion. A minimum of five market makers is required. Jumbo Pfandbriefe must be listed on the German stock exchange. Total Jumbo covered bonds first-time sales amounted to EUR 161.3 billion in 2007. In 2007, the four biggest jumbo covered bond-issuing countries were France (24.7%), Spain (22.3%), Germany (20%), and the UK (10.7%).
