= Biweekly mortgage =

A Biweekly mortgage is a type of mortgage loan where payments are made every two weeks rather than monthly. Monthly, Semi-monthly, Bi-weekly, Weekly, Accelerated bi-weekly and Accelerated weekly payment types are available. Most biweekly payment plans are offered by third-parties who charge fees for this service. While a biweekly payment plan will reduce the loan term and total interest paid, the same thing can be achieved by submitting an extra mortgage payment each year.

The biweekly payment is exactly one half of the amount a monthly payment would be. Though it depends on other factors such as the interest rate of the loan, a biweekly mortgage payment plan often saves the consumer money over the life of the loan. For example, a 30-year mortgage of $200,000 with an interest rate of 6.5% will require a monthly payment of $1,264.14. When this mortgage is converted to a biweekly mortgage payment plan, the payment will be $632.07 paid every two weeks. Paying the mortgage this way will result in the mortgage being paid off nearly 6 years sooner and it will result in a savings of $58,747.11.

The key difference between a biweekly mortgage payment plan and a traditional mortgage payment plan is that instead of making 12 full payments each year, 26 half payments--the equivalent of 13 full payments--are made each year. On a biweekly mortgage payment plan, some months will require 3 payments or 1 and one half traditional payments. Finance companies use this pattern to their advantage. Finance companies charge interest on a per day basis instead of monthly. The consumer's repayment is scheduled on a monthly basis. This allows the finance companies to collect an additional 2 weeks of interest every year. Paying biweekly payments allows consumers to eliminate the additional accrued interest charges.

Most lenders do not offer an actual biweekly payment program and rely on 3rd party processors primarily because they do not accept partial payments from the consumer. Although there are some fees involved, the biweekly programs available for enrollment online can save the consumer on a mortgage and reduce the length of time required to pay back the loan. Some biweekly payment processors do not charge up-front fees and instead deduct a fee from the savings accrued by following the biweekly pattern.

== Criticism ==
Many real estate experts argue that keeping an existing monthly payment mortgage and making one extra payment each year will result in the same savings as a Biweekly Mortgage payment plan would. They also argue that some mortgage companies charge large amounts of service fees to convert a mortgage to a Biweekly payment plan, and this may constitute an indecorous business practice on behalf of these mortgage companies. Another argument against a Biweekly Mortgage is that the lender and 3rd party processors place the first half of the monthly payment into holding until the second half of the monthly payment is applied, which allows the bank to minimize profitability losses from the program.
