= Covered bond =

Financial product

Covered bonds are debt securities issued by a bank or mortgage institution and collateralised against a pool of assets that, in case of failure of the issuer, can cover claims at any point of time. They are subject to specific legislation to protect bond holders. Unlike asset-backed securities created in securitization, the covered bonds continue as obligations of the issuer; in essence, the investor has recourse against the issuer and the collateral, sometimes known as "dual recourse". Typically, covered bond assets remain on the issuer's consolidated balance sheet (usually with an appropriate capital charge).

As of beginning of 2019 volume of outstanding covered bonds worldwide was euro 2,577 billion, while largest markets were Denmark (€406 bil.), Germany (€370 bil.), France (€321 bil.) and Spain (€232 bil.).

== History ==
Covered bonds were created in Prussia in 1769 by Frederick The Great and in Denmark in 1795. Danish covered bond lending emerged after the Great Fire of Copenhagen in 1795, when a quarter of the city burnt to the ground. After the fire, a great need arose for an organized credit market as a large number of new buildings were needed over a short period of time. Today nearly all real estate is financed with covered bonds in Denmark, and Denmark is the 3rd largest issuer in Europe.

In Prussia these Pfandbriefe were sold by estates of the country and regulated under public law. They were secured by real estate and subsidiary by the issuing estate. In about 1850, the first mortgage banks were allowed to sell Pfandbriefe as a means to refinance mortgage loans. With the mortgage banks law of 1900, the whole German Empire was given a standardized legal foundation for the issuance of Pfandbriefe.

== Structure ==
A covered bond is a corporate bond with one important enhancement: recourse to a pool of assets that secures or "covers" the bond if the issuer (usually a financial institution) becomes insolvent. These assets act as additional credit cover; they do not have any bearing on the contractual cash flow to the investor, as is the case with Securitized assets.

For the investor, one major advantage to a covered bond is that the debt and the underlying asset pool remain on the issuer's financials, and issuers must ensure that the pool consistently backs the covered bond. In the event of default, the investor has recourse to both the pool and the issuer.

Because non-performing loans or prematurely paid debt must be replaced in the pool, success of the product for the issuer depends on the institution's ability to maintain the credit quality of the cover pool by replacing the non-performing and repaid assets in the pool.

=== Redemption regimes ===
There are three major redemption regimes for covered bonds:

1. Hard-bullet covered bonds: payments have to be made when due according to the original schedule. Failure to pay on the Standard Maturity Date (SMD) triggers default of the covered bonds, and the covered bonds accelerate. Until a few years ago, hard bullet structures were regarded as market practice. This means that if the respective covered bond issuer is not able to comply with their outstanding payment obligations, investors will obtain access to the respective covered bond programme's cover pool. If redemption of an issue is pending and the liquid funds available are not sufficient to redeem the bond and liquidity cannot be generated by another means, the collateral in the pool will be sold if the bond has a hard bullet structure. This means that investors can expect prompt repayment on the one hand but this is associated on the other hand with refinancing risk or market value risk - the risk that the market values of the assets may be reduced and, in extreme circumstances, the full repayment amount is not covered by the sales proceeds.
2. Soft-bullet covered bonds: payments have to be made when due according to the original schedule. Failure to pay on the SMD does not trigger covered bond default. The extension period grants more time (typically at least 12 months) to repay the covered bonds, setting a new Final Maturity Date (FMD). Failure to pay on the FMD triggers default and acceleration of the covered bond. Soft bullet structures and, more rarely, CPT structures as well (cf. the next bullet point), exist to counter the refinancing risk mentioned above. With regard to possible extension periods, a postponement of maturity by twelve months has become established under soft bullet structures.
3. Conditional pass-through covered bonds (CPT): payments have to be made when due according to the original schedule. Failure to pay by the SMD does not trigger default of that covered bond. The affected covered bond goes into pass-through mode. All other outstanding covered bonds are not affected and would only trigger the pass-through mode one after another if they are not redeemed on their respective SMDs. The original repayment date can be postponed for far longer in the case of a CPT structure. This also reduces the refinancing risk to a minimum at the same time. In contrast to the soft bullet structure, once the pass-through structure is triggered, the outstanding covered bond issues are redeemed firstly from the inflows generated from the assets associated with them and also from the sale of assets, if they can be sold at adequate market prices. However, in contrast to the soft bullet structure, the date at which investors can expect the outstanding claims to be serviced cannot be determined ex ante. Rather, in the worst-case scenario, they can only be determined upon maturity of the assets with the longest term.

No uniform trigger events have so far become established on the market to trigger an extension period (beyond the repayment date originally agreed under a soft bullet or CPT structures). Examples of possible triggers within the soft bullet and CPT structures include (i) the issuer's insolvency and postponement of redemption to a later repayment date by an independent trustee or (ii) the postponement of the original repayment date by the issuer.

If investors’ claims can be serviced when they originally fall due, there are no differences between the three payment structures as far as investors are concerned. However, rating agencies view soft bullet, and even more so CPT structures because the refinancing risk is lower, as positive factors in assessing their ratings.

Covered bond markets, where Hard-bullet structures prevail are Germany, France, Spain and Sweden. Typical Soft-bullet markets are UK, Switzerland, Norway, Italy, Netherlands, Canada and Australia. CPT structures have been seen in the Netherlands, Italy and Poland.

=== Rating agencies' approach to rate covered bonds ===
A comprehensive high level overview on the way rating agencies are evaluating the credit risk of a covered bond programme can be found in Chapter IV of the European Covered bond Councils (ECBC) Covered bond Fact book.

The Factbook is updated annually and also maintains more in depth summaries directly provided by the rating agencies.

Rating agencies usually apply a two-step analysis when rating covered bonds:

1. At the first stage, a quantitative model is applied that produces a maximum potential rating based on (1) the probability that the issuer will cease making payments under the covered bonds (this maximum potential rating is called a CB anchor); and (2) the estimated losses that will accrue to the cover pool should the issuer cease making payments under the covered bonds (this event is called a CB anchor event).
2. Then the maximum potential rating produced at the previous stage is refined to account for certain risks, particularly refinancing risk, arising on the occurrence of a CB anchor event. This is done by applying the so-called timely payment indicator (TPI) framework. The TPI framework limits the rating uplift that covered bonds may achieve over the CB anchor and may constrain the final covered bond rating to a lower level than the maximum potential rating under the quantitative model.

Usually the issuer's rating is used as a reference point (CB anchor) from which a probability of default for the issuer's payment obligations is derived.

== See also ==
- Financial instruments
- European Covered Bond Council
- Securitization
- The Cover
