= Package loan =

Type of real estate loan

A package loan is a real estate loan used to finance the purchase of both real property and personal property, such as in the purchase of a fully furnished condominium.
