= Federal Housing Administration =

U.S. government agency responsible for mortgage insurance

- Seal of the U.S. Department of Housing and Urban Development

Agency overview
- Formed: 1934
- Jurisdiction: United States
- Headquarters: Robert C. Weaver Federal Building; Washington, D.C.
- Agency executive: Frank Cassidy, Assistant Secretary for Housing and Federal Housing Commissioner
- Parent department: Department of Housing and Urban Development
- Key document: National Housing Act of 1934
- Website: www.hud.gov

Footnotes
- Also known as the Office of Housing

The Federal Housing Administration (FHA), also known as the Office of Housing within the Department of Housing and Urban Development (HUD), is a United States government agency founded by President Franklin Delano Roosevelt, created in part by the National Housing Act of 1934. The FHA insures mortgages made by private lenders for single-family properties, multifamily rental properties, hospitals, and residential care facilities. FHA mortgage insurance protects lenders against losses. If a property owner defaults on their mortgage, FHA pays a claim to the lender for the unpaid principal balance. Because lenders take on less risk, they are able to offer more mortgages. The goal of the organization is to facilitate access to affordable mortgage credit for low- and moderate-income and first-time homebuyers, for the construction of affordable and market rate rental properties, and for hospitals and residential care facilities in communities across the United States and its territories.

It is different from the Federal Housing Finance Agency (FHFA), which supervises government-sponsored enterprises.

The FHA is currently led by Assistant Secretary for Housing and Federal Housing Commissioner Frank Cassidy.

== History ==
=== New Deal origins ===
During the Great Depression many banks failed, causing a drastic decrease in home loans and ownership. At that time, most home mortgages were short-term (three to five years), with no amortization, and balloon instruments at loan-to-value (LTV) ratios below sixty percent. This prevented many working and middle-class families from being able to afford home ownership. The banking crisis of the 1930s forced all lenders to retrieve due mortgages; refinancing was not available, and many borrowers, now unemployed, were unable to make mortgage payments. Consequently, many homes were foreclosed, causing the housing market to plummet. Banks collected the loan collateral (foreclosed homes) but the low property values resulted in a relative lack of assets. In 1934 the federal banking system was restructured. The National Housing Act of 1934 created the Federal Housing Administration. with the intention to regulate the rate of interest and the terms of insured mortgages. Before the FHA was established, many mortgages were balloon mortgages that required large payments at the end of the mortgage period, The mortgage period was typically 5 to 10 years. To secure a mortgage, people needed a large down payment of 30 to 50%. With the new FHA-secured loans, people now only needed a down payment as low as 10% and mortgage payment period went from 5–10 years to 20–30 years. In 1934 the newly formed FHA hired Homer Hoyt as Chief Land Economist to write the first FHA underwriting criteria resulting in the Redlining policy.

==== Appraisal criteria and race discrimination ====
The new practices were restricted only to white Americans. These new lending practices increased the number of white Americans who could afford a down payment on a house and monthly debt service payments on a mortgage, thereby also increasing the size of the market for single-family homes. The FHA calculated appraisal value based on eight criteria and directed its agents (called "appraisers") to lend more for higher appraised projects, up to a maximum cap. The two most important were "Relative Economic Stability", which constituted 40% of appraisal value, and "protection from adverse influences", which made up another 20%. In 1935, the FHA provided its appraisers with an Underwriting Manual, which gave the following instruction: "If a neighborhood is to retain stability it is necessary that properties shall continue to be occupied by the same social and racial classes. A change in social or racial occupancy generally leads to instability and a reduction of values." Appraisers were then told to give higher property and zoning ratings where "protection against some adverse influences is obtained", and defined adverse influences as "infiltration by inharmonious racial or nationality groups". Because the FHA's appraisal standards included a whites-only requirement, racial segregation became an official requirement of the federal mortgage insurance program, as the FHA frequently judged any properties in racially mixed neighborhoods or in close proximity to black neighborhoods as being high-risk.

=== Fannie Mae and G.I. Bill ===
In 1938 Congress created the Federal National Mortgage Association (Fannie Mae) which helped establish a secondary mortgage market in which banks and investors could buy and sell current home loans. After the adoption of the Serviceman's Readjustment Act (known as the GI Bill) in 1944, the FHA brought together a system of long-term mortgages for the construction and sale of private homes. The Veteran's Administration's home-loan guarantee program through the GI Bill allowed veterans to put down a payment of only one dollar. These changes helped fuel a surge in American home ownership, with families living in owner-occupied homes increasing 44 percent to 63 percent from 1934 and 1972.

=== Major housing projects ===
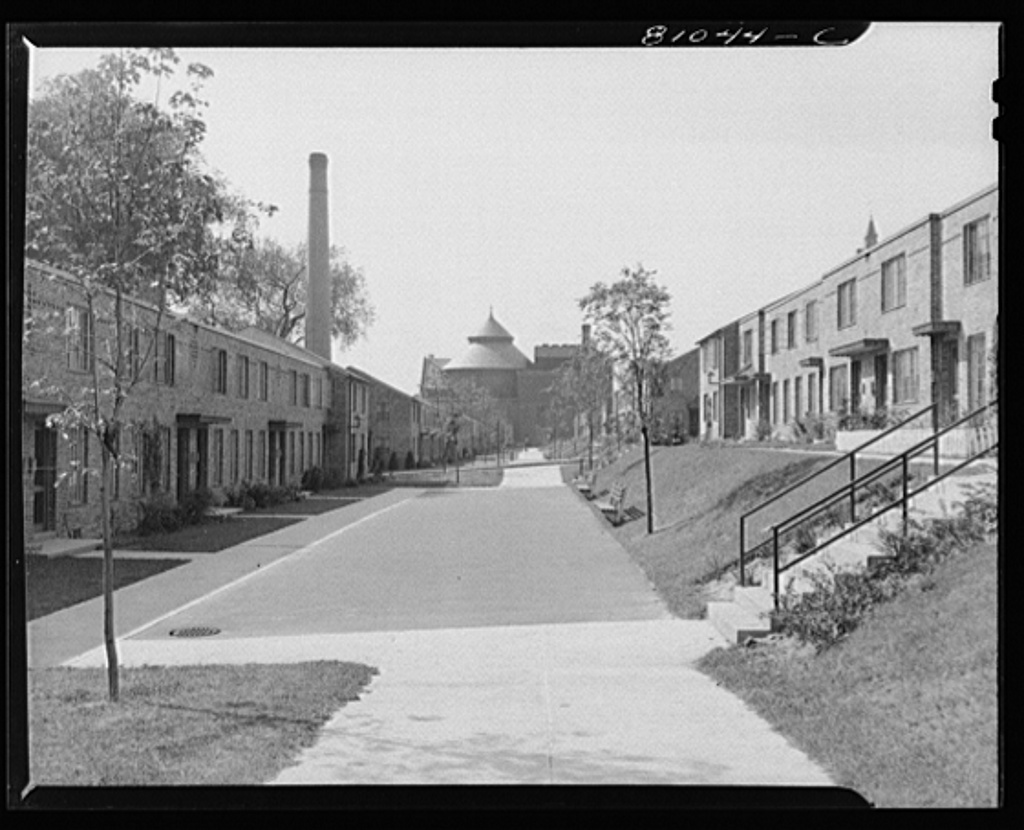
FHA project great depression

In 1935, Colonial Village in Arlington County, Virginia, was the first large-scale, rental housing project erected in the United States that was Federal Housing Administration-insured. During World War II, the FHA financed a number of worker's housing projects including the Kensington Gardens Apartment Complex in Buffalo, New York. During the Great Depression, Ohio Cities used federal government funds for building housing projects and first two of those projects completed in the United States were in Cincinnati and Cleveland.

The FHA was led by the Federal Housing Commissioner Raymond M. Foley (1945–47) and Franklin D. Richards (1947–52). In 1954, Norman P. Mason was appointed as the Federal Housing Commissioner.

=== Establishment of HUD ===
In 1965, the Federal Housing Administration became part of the Department of Housing and Urban Development with the Passage of the Department of Housing and Urban Development Act of 1965. When the FHA became part of HUD, the FHA became a separate entity within HUD. A Federal Housing Commissioner who would also be an Assistant Secretary would head the FHA. The FHA and HUD have their similarities and differences. The Commissioner designated would administer all other departmental programs that relate to the private mortgage market in addition to duties as Assistant Secretary and FHA head. The FHA and HUD both help borrowers with bad credit and insufficient down payment to be able to buy or repair a house.

== Subprime mortgage crisis ==
In the late 1990s, subprime mortgage products emerged and competed with the standard mortgages financed by the FHA. These products were typically poorly underwritten (if it all) and had higher profits for lenders. As a result lenders were motivated to turn borrowers toward subprime products even when qualified for FHA loans, which were safer. As the subprime mortgage market boomed, the FHA's market share of mortgages fell; in 2001 the FHA insured 14% of home-purchase loans, but by 2005 that number fell to less than 3%. The influx of these unregulated subprime loans helped fuel the United States housing bubble, which led to the subprime mortgage crisis and the near-collapse of the housing market. Following the subprime mortgage crisis, FHA, along with Fannie Mae and Freddie Mac, became a large source of mortgage financing in the United States. The share of home purchases financed with FHA mortgages went from 2 percent to over one-third of mortgages in the United States, as conventional mortgage lending dried up in the credit crunch. By 2011 the FHA backed about 40% of all home purchase loans in America. Since 2008 the FHA has backed more than 4 million loans and helped 2.6 million families lower monthly payments through refinancing. With the private subprime market, many of the riskiest buyers borrowed from the FHA instead, exposing the FHA to substantial potential losses. At the time, these possible losses were estimate as up to $100 billion. The troubled loans weighed heavily on the FHA's capital reserve fund, which by early 2012 had fallen below its congressionally mandated minimum of 2%, in contrast to more than 6% two years earlier. By November 2012, the FHA was essentially bankrupt.

== Mortgage insurance ==
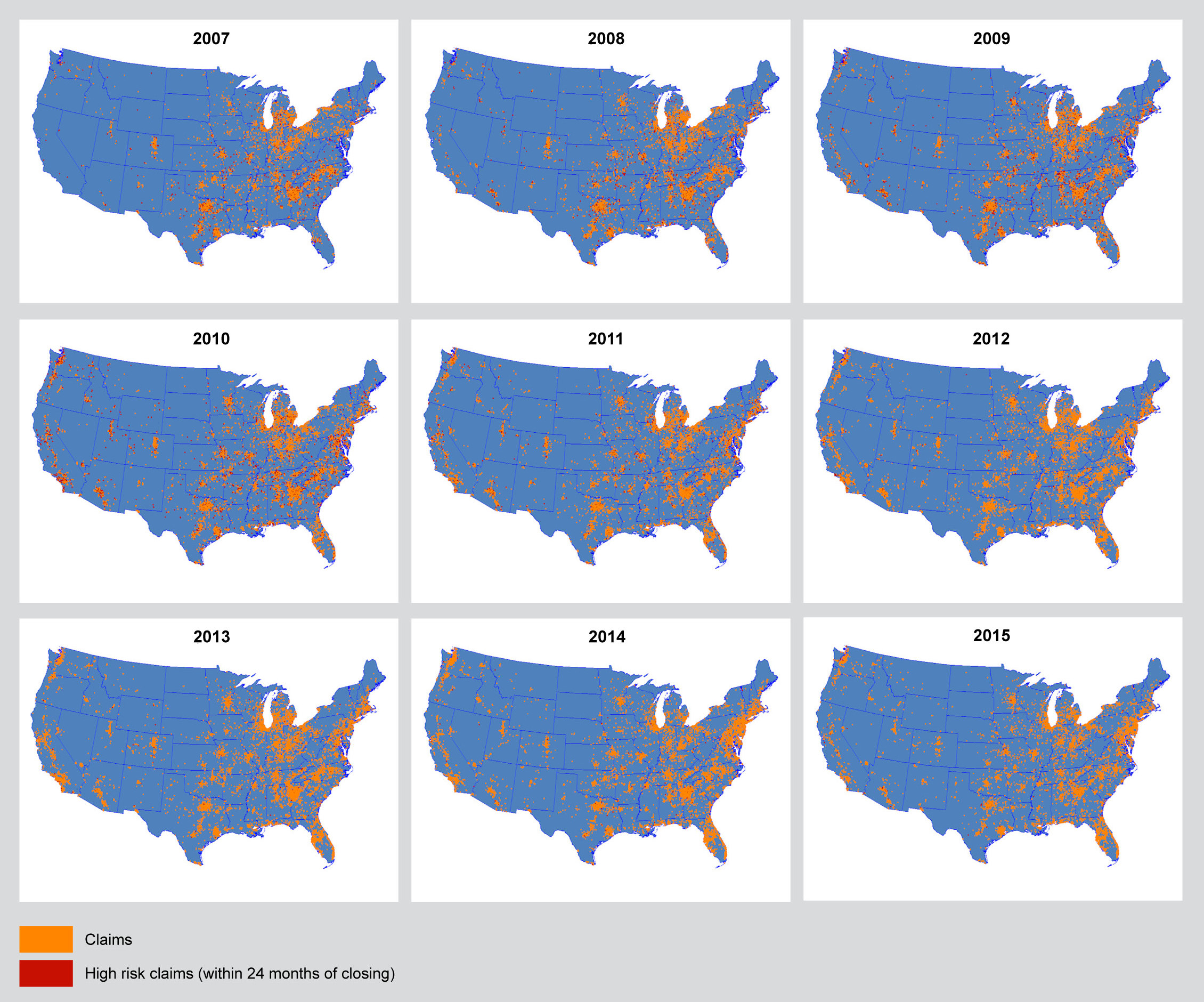
Visualization by the Government Accountability Office of FHA mortgage insurance claims from 2007 to 2015

Since 1934, the FHA and HUD have insured almost 50 million home mortgages. Currently, the FHA has approximately 8.5 million insured single family mortgage, more than 11,000 insured multifamily mortgages, and over 3,900 mortgages for hospitals and residential care facilities in its portfolio.

=== FHA down payment ===
A borrower's down payment may come from a number of sources. The 3.5% requirement can be satisfied with the borrower using their own cash or receiving an eligible gift from a family member or other eligible source.

=== FHA mortgage insurance ===
The FHA insurance payments include two parts: the upfront mortgage insurance premium (UFMIP) and the annual premium remitted on a monthly basis—the mutual mortgage insurance (MMI). The UFMIP is an obligatory payment, which can either be made in cash at closing or financed into the loan. If someone takes out a typical 30-year mortgage, the annual insurance premium will be like this, if the base loan amount is less than or equal too $625,500, and the LTV is greater than or equal to 95%, than the annual MIP will be 80 bps (0.80%). If the base loan amount is less than or equal too $625,500, and the LTV is greater than 95%, than the annual MIP will be 85 bps (0.85%). If the base loan amount is greater than $625,500, and the LTV is less than or equal to 95%, than the Annual MIP will be 100 bps (1.00%). If the base loan amount is greater than $625,500, and the LTV is more than 95%, than the annual MIP is 105% (1.05%). Homebuyers who are able to payoff their loans quicker, and want a 15-year mortgage, will have lower mortgage insurance premiums, like this if the base loan amount is less than or equal too $625,500, and the LTV is less than or equal to 90%, than the annual MIP is 45 bps (0.45%). If the base loan amount is less than or equal too $625,500, and the LTV is greater than 90%, thean the annual MIP is 70 bps (0.70%). If the base loan amount is more than $625,500, and the LTV is less than or equal to 78%, than the annial MIP will be 45 bps (0.45%). If the base loan amount is more than $625,500, and the LTV is 78.01% to 90%, than annual MIP will be 70 bps (0.70%). If the base loan amount is more than $625,500, and the LTV is greater than 90%, than the LTV will be 95 bps (0.95%). For loans with FHA Case Numbers assigned on or after June 3, 2013, The FHA will take the annual MIP and this is when people will pay for the FHA Mortgage Insurance Premiums on your FHA loan, it goes like this, when the term is less than or equal to 15 years, when the LTV is less than or equal to 78% and there was previously no annual MIP, than the new time to pay is 11 years. When the term is less than or equal to 15 years, when the LTV is 78.01% to 90%, and previously cancelled at 78% LTV, than the new time to pay is 11 years. When the term is less than or equal to 15 years, when the LTV is more than 90%, and previously was paid at loan term, than norhing changes. When the new term is greater than 15 years, when the LTV is less than or equal to 70% and the previous time to pay was 5 years, than the new time to pay is 11 years. When the new term is greater than 15 years, when the LTV is 78.01% to 90%, and previously cancelled at 78% and 5 years, than new payment time is 11 years. When the new term is greater than 15 years, when the LTV is greater than 90%, and previously cancelled at 78% and 5 years, than the new payment time is the loan term. The current up-front mortgage insurance premium is 1.75% of the base loan amount. This is the case regardless of the amorization term or LTV ratio.

Today 46% of all first-time home buyers use FHA loans. 1 in 16 FHA loan borrowers have a credit score below 600 and the average credit score of first-time FHA loan borrowers is 677. First-time home buyers used 82 percent of all FHA purchase loans. 23 percent of home buyers use an FHA loan as well as 28 percent of home buyers 37 and younger used an FHA loan. 13% of buyers and 24% of buyers under 37 said that the most difficult task. the average amount for a down payment is $6,624. The average debt-to-income ration for FHA Borrowers is 40.34%. The average FHA loan amount is $191,650. The minimum credit score required for an FHA loan with a down payment of 10 percent is 500.

== Legacy ==
The creation of the Federal Housing Administration successfully increased the size of the housing market. Home ownership increased from 40% in the 1930s to 61% and 65% in 1995. Home ownership peaked at nearly 69% in 2005, near the peak of the US housing bubble. By 1938 only four years after the beginning of the Federal Housing Administration, a house could be purchased for a down payment of only ten percent of the purchase price. The remaining ninety percent was financed by 25-year, self-amortizing, FHA-insured mortgage loan. After World War II, the FHA helped finance homes for returning white veterans and the families of white soldiers. It has helped with purchases of both single family and multifamily homes. In the 1950s, 1960s, and 1970s, the FHA helped to spark the production of millions of units of privately owned apartments for elderly, handicapped, and lower-income Americans. When the soaring inflation and energy costs threatened the survival of thousands of private apartment buildings in the 1970s, FHA's emergency financing kept cash-strapped properties afloat. In the 1980s, when the economy did not support an increase in homeowners, the FHA helped to steady falling prices, making it possible for potential homeowners to finance when private mortgage insurers pulled out of oil-producing states. The greatest effects of the Federal Housing Administration can be seen within minority populations and in cities. Nearly half of FHA's metropolitan area business is located in central cities, a percentage that is much higher than that of conventional loans. The FHA also lends to a higher percentage of African Americans and Hispanic Americans, as well as younger, credit-constrained borrowers, contributing to the increase in home ownership among these groups. As the capital markets in the United States matured over several decades, the impact of the FHA decreased. In 2006 FHA made up less than 3% of all the loans originated in the United States. In fiscal year 2019, FHA-insured mortgages comprised 11.41% of all single family residential mortgage originations by dollar volume. 82.84% of FHA insured single family forward purchase transaction mortgages in fiscal year 2019 were for first-time homebuyers. Overall, minorities made up 36.24% of FHA purchase mortgage borrowers in calendar year 2018, compared to 19.94% through conventional lending channels.

=== Redlining ===
The Federal Housing Administration established mortgage underwriting standards that significantly discriminated against minority neighborhoods. Between 1945 and 1959, African Americans received less than 2 percent of all federally insured home loans. As the significance of subsidized mortgage insurance on the housing market grew, home values in inner-city minority neighborhoods plummeted. Also, the approval rates for minorities were equally low. After 1935, the FHA established guidelines to steer private mortgage investors away from minority areas. This practice, known as redlining, was made illegal by the Fair Housing Act of 1968. Redlining has had long-lasting effects on minority communities. The legacy of redlining can still be felt today as redlining is responsible for the modern wealth gap between African and White Americans.

== See also ==
- Ginnie Mae
- New Deal
- Levittown
- Mortgage insurance

== Sources ==
- Brown, Christopher C. "The Virtual Reference Desk". Federal Housing Administration.
- "Homes and Communities". The Federal Housing Administration. U.S. Department of Housing and Urban Development. Archived from the original on January 5, 2010.
- Monroe, Albert (November 2001), How the Federal Housing Administration Affects Homeownership (PDF), Cambridge, MA: Harvard University Department of Economics, archived from the original (PDF) on October 22, 2006
- Wright, Kai (April 29, 2009). "More Mortgage Madness". The Nation.
