= Refinancing risk =

Refinancing risk, in banking and finance, is the possibility that a borrower cannot refinance by borrowing to repay existing debt. Many types of commercial lending incorporate balloon payments at the point of final maturity. The intention or assumption is often that the borrower will take out a new loan to pay the existing lenders.

A borrower that cannot refinance their existing debt and needs more funds on hand to pay its lenders may have a liquidity problem. The borrower may be considered technically insolvent. Even though their assets are greater than their liabilities, they cannot raise liquid funds to pay their creditors. Insolvency may lead to bankruptcy even if the borrower has a positive net worth.

To repay the debt at maturity, the borrower that cannot refinance may be forced into a fire sale of assets at a low price, including the borrower's own home and productive assets such as factories and plants.

Most large corporations and banks face this risk to some degree, as they may constantly borrow and repay loans.

Most commercial banks provide long-term loans and fund this operation by taking shorter-term deposits.

In general, refinancing risk is considered to be substantial for banks only during a financial crisis, when borrowing funds, such as interbank deposits, may be extremely difficult.

Refinancing is also known as "rolling over" debt of various maturities and so refinancing risk may be referred to also as rollover risk.

== See also ==
- Liquidity risk
