= Cross-collateralization =

Cross-collateralization is a term used when the collateral for one loan is also used as collateral for another loan. If a person has borrowed from the same bank a home loan secured by the house, a car loan secured by the car, and so on, these assets can be used as cross-collaterals for all the loans. If the person pays off the car loan and wants to sell the car, the bank may veto the deal because the car is still used to secure the home loan and other loans. Technically, cross-collateralization expires when the borrower has no outstanding loans with the bank. In the context of bankruptcy, cross-collateralization also means the collateralization of general unsecured prepetition debt by collateral securing postpetition loans.

Another example of cross-collateralization occurs when an individual may have a checking account and a loan at the same bank. If the individual becomes past due on the loan, the financial institution may take money out of the bank account or freeze the account until the loan becomes current. Cross-collateralization reduces the lender's risk; hence, credit unions often offer cross-collateralized loans as a way to give borrowers lower interest rates.

Royalty advances paid by a publisher to authors of multiple books or to creators of multiple video games are often cross-collateralized; in book publishing this is sometimes called "basketing". In this scheme, the publisher pays no royalty checks to the creator until all of the books (or video games, or other works of authorship) have "earned out" their advances.

In the movie industry, cross-collateralization clauses in production deals allow the funding studio to recoup a part of its losses for money losing films from hit films produced.
