= Defeasance =

Defeasance (or defeazance) (French: défaire, to undo), in law, is an instrument which defeats the force or operation of some other deed or estate; as distinguished from condition, that which in the same deed is called a condition is a defeasance in another deed. The term is used in several contexts in finance, including:

- a clause in a mortgage granting a borrower exclusive ownership in a property after a debt is repaid,
- a corporate finance technique where a corporate bond issue is repaid through an irrevocable trust, which allows the corporation to remove liabilities from its balance sheet; notably used by Exxon in 1982

A defeasance should recite the deed to be defeated and its date, and it must be made between the same parties as are interested in the deed to which it is collateral. It must be of a thing defensible, and all the conditions must be strictly carried out before the defeasance can be consummated. Defeasance in a bill of sale is the putting an end to the security by realizing the goods for the benefit of the mortgagee. It is not strictly a defeasance, because the stipulation is in the same deed; it is really a condition in the nature.
