= Loan servicing =

Part of a loaning process

Loan servicing is the process by which a company (mortgage bank, servicing firm, etc.) collects interest, principal, and escrow payments from a borrower. In the United States, the vast majority of mortgages are backed by the government or government-sponsored entities (GSEs) through purchase by Fannie Mae, Freddie Mac, or Ginnie Mae (which purchases loans insured by the Federal Housing Administration (FHA) or guaranteed by the Department of Veterans Affairs (VA)). Because GSEs and private loan investors typically do not service the mortgage loans that they purchase, the bank who sells the mortgage will generally retain the right to service the mortgage pursuant to a master servicing agreement.

The payments collected by the mortgage servicer are remitted to various parties; distributions typically include paying taxes and insurance from escrowed funds, remitting principal and interest payments to investors holding mortgage-backed securities (or other types of instruments backed by pools of mortgage loans), and remitting fees to mortgage guarantors, trustees, and other third parties providing services. The level of service varies depending on the type of loan and the terms negotiated between the servicer and the investor seeking their services, and may also include activities such as monitoring delinquencies, workouts/ restructurings and executing foreclosures.

In exchange for performing these activities, the servicer generally receives contractually specified servicing fees and other ancillary sources of income such as float and late charges. Mortgage servicing became "far more profitable during the housing boom", and some servicers targeted borrowers "less likely to make timely payments" in order to collect more late fees.

Servicers (servicing companies) are normally compensated by receiving a percentage of the unpaid balance on the loans they service. The fee rate can be anywhere from one to forty-four basis points depending on the size of the loan, whether it is secured by commercial or residential real estate, and the level of service required. Those services can include (but aren't limited to) statements, impounds, collections, tax reporting, and other requirements.

== Companies involved ==
TriMont, PNC Financial Services, Bank of America, JPMorgan Chase, Ocwen Financial Corporation are examples of large companies involved in the loan servicing industry.

== See also ==
- Loan origination
- Primary servicer
