= Balloon payment mortgage =

Type of mortgage where a large final payment is expected

A balloon payment mortgage is a mortgage that does not fully amortize over the term of the note, thus leaving a balance due at maturity. The final payment is called a balloon payment because of its large size. Balloon payment mortgages are more common in commercial real estate than in residential real estate today due to the prevalence of mortgages with longer periods of amortization, in particular, the 30-year fixed-rate mortgages. A balloon payment mortgage may have a fixed or a floating interest rate. The most common way of describing a balloon loan uses the terminology X due in Y, where X is the number of years over which the loan is amortized, and Y is the year in which the principal balance is due.

An example of a balloon payment mortgage is the seven-year Fannie Mae Balloon, which features monthly payments based on a thirty-year amortization. In the United States, the amount of the balloon payment must be stated in the contract if Truth-in-Lending provisions apply to the loan. Most commonly, term lengths are five or seven years.

Because borrowers may not have the resources to make the balloon payment at the end of the loan term, a "two-step" mortgage plan may be used with balloon payment mortgages. Under the two-step plan, sometimes referred to as "reset option," the mortgage note "resets" using current market rates and using a fully amortizing payment schedule. That option is not necessarily automatic and may be available only if the borrower is still the owner/occupant, has no thirty-day late payments in the preceding twelve months, and has no other liens against the property. For balloon payment mortgages without a reset option or if the reset option is not available, the expectation is that either the borrower will have sold the property or refinanced the loan by the end of the loan term. That may mean that there is a refinancing risk.

== Confusion ==
Adjustable rate mortgages are sometimes confused with balloon payment mortgages. The distinction is that a balloon payment may require refinancing or repayment at the end of the period; some adjustable-rate mortgages do not need to be refinanced, and the interest rate is automatically adjusted at the end of the applicable period. Some countries do not allow balloon payment mortgages for residential housing: the lender then must continue the loan (the reset option is required). For the borrower, therefore, there is no risk that the lender will refuse to refinance or continue the loan.

A related piece of jargon is bullet payment. With a bullet loan, a bullet payment is paid back when the loan comes to its contractual maturity (for example, when it reaches the deadline set to repayment at the time the loan was granted), representing the full loan amount (also called principal). Periodic interest payments are generally made throughout the life of the loan.

== Amortization ==
The typical arrangement for repaying a residential loan is called amortizing payment or amortization.

With amortization, portions of the principal are periodically being repaid (along with the loan's interest payments) until the loan matures. With full amortization, the amortization schedule has been set so that the last periodical payment comprises the final portion of principal still due.

With partial amortization, a balloon payment will still be required at maturity, covering the part of the loan amount still outstanding. This approach is very common in automotive financing where the balloon payment is often calculated with respect to the value of the vehicle at the end of the financing term—so the borrower can return the vehicle in lieu of making the balloon payment.

== Prevalence ==
Balloon payments or bullet payments are common for certain types of debt. Most bonds, for example, are non-amortizing instruments where the coupon payments cover interest only, and the full amount of the bond's face value is paid at final maturity.

== Refinancing risk ==
Balloon payments introduce a certain amount of risk for the borrower and the lender. In many cases, the intention of the borrower is to refinance the amount of the balloon payment at the final maturity date. Refinancing risk exists at this point since it is possible that at the time of payment, the borrower will not be able to refinance the loan; the borrower faces the risk of having insufficient liquid funds, and the lender faces the risk that the payment may be delayed. Because balloon mortgages can carry risk, some lenders may require a minimum 20% down payment from the borrower.

== See also ==
- Biweekly mortgage
