= Federal Reserve responses to the subprime crisis =

The U.S. central banking system, the Federal Reserve, in partnership with central banks around the world, took several steps to address the subprime mortgage crisis. Federal Reserve Chairman Ben Bernanke stated in early 2008: "Broadly, the Federal Reserve’s response has followed two tracks: efforts to support market liquidity and functioning and the pursuit of our macroeconomic objectives through monetary policy." A 2011 study by the Government Accountability Office found that "on numerous occasions in 2008 and 2009, the Federal Reserve Board invoked emergency authority under the Federal Reserve Act of 1913 to authorize new broad-based programs and financial assistance to individual institutions to stabilize financial markets. Loans outstanding for the emergency programs peaked at more than $1 (~$1.00 in 2023) trillion in late 2008."

Broadly stated, the Fed chose to provide a "blank cheque" for the banks, instead of providing liquidity and taking over. It did not shut down or clean up most troubled banks; and did not force out bank management or any bank officials responsible for taking bad risks, despite the fact that most of them had major roles in driving to disaster their institutions and the financial system as a whole. This lavishing of cash and gentle treatment was the opposite of the harsh terms the U.S. had demanded when the financial sectors of emerging market economies encountered crises in the 1990s.

== Signaling ==
In August 2007, Committee announced that "downside risks to growth have increased appreciably," a signal that interest rate cuts might be forthcoming. Between 18 September 2007 and 30 April 2008, the target for the Federal funds rate was lowered from 5.25% to 2% and the discount rate was lowered from 5.75% to 2.25%, through six separate actions. The discount rate is the interest rate charged to commercial banks and other depository institutions on loans they receive from their regional Federal Reserve Bank's lending facility via the Discount window.

== Expansion of Fed Balance Sheet ("Quantitative Easing") ==
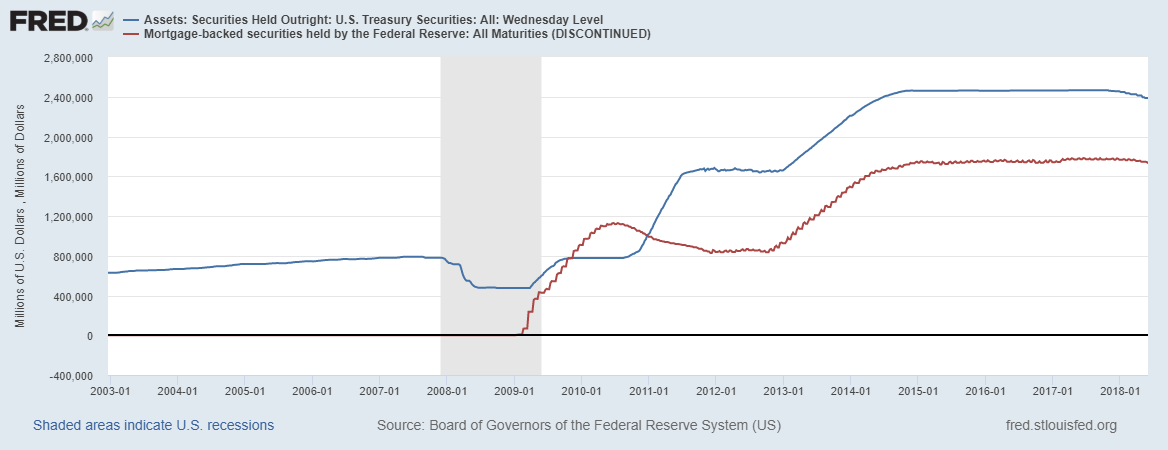
Federal Reserve Holdings of Treasury and Mortgage-Backed Securities

The Fed can electronically create money and use it to lend against the collateral of various types, such as agency mortgage-backed securities or asset-backed commercial paper. This is effectively "printing money" and increases the money supply, which under normal economic conditions creates inflationary pressure. Ben Bernanke called this approach "credit easing", possibly to distinguish it from the widely used expression Quantitative easing. In a March 2009 interview, he stated that the expansion of the Fed balance sheet was necessary "...because our economy is very weak and inflation is very low. When the economy begins to recover, that will be the time that we need to unwind those programs, raise interest rates, reduce the money supply, and make sure that we have a recovery that does not involve inflation."

Both the actual and authorized size of the Fed balance sheet (i.e., the amount it is allowed to borrow from the Treasury to lend) was increased significantly during the crisis. The money created was funneled through certain financial institutions, which use it to lend to corporations issuing the financial instruments that serve as collateral. The type or scope of assets eligible to be collateral for such loans has expanded throughout the crisis.

In March 2009, the Federal Open Market Committee (FOMC) decided to increase the size of the Federal Reserve's balance sheet further by purchasing up to an additional $750 billion of government-sponsored agency mortgage-backed securities, bringing its total purchases of these securities to up to $1.25 trillion during 2009, and to increase its purchases of agency debt this year by up to $100 billion to a total of up to $200 billion. Moreover, to help improve conditions in private credit markets, the Committee decided to purchase up to $300 billion (~$414 billion in 2023) of longer-term Treasury securities during 2009.

== Mortgage lending rules ==
In July 2008, the Fed finalized new rules that apply to mortgage lenders. Fed Chairman Ben Bernanke stated that the rules "prohibit lenders from making higher-priced loans without due regard for consumers' ability to make the scheduled payments and require lenders to verify the income and assets on which they rely when making the credit decision. Also, for higher-priced loans, lenders now will be required to establish escrow accounts so that property taxes and insurance costs will be included in consumers' regular monthly payments...Other measures address the coercion of appraisers, servicer practices, and other issues. We believe the new rules will help to restore confidence in the mortgage market."

== Open market operations ==
=== Agency Mortgage-Backed Securities (MBS) Purchase Program ===
The Fed and other central banks have conducted open market operations to ensure member banks have access to funds (i.e., liquidity). These are effectively short-term loans to member banks collateralized by government securities. Central banks have also lowered the interest rates charged to member banks (called the discount rate in the U.S.) for short-term loans. Both measures effectively lubricate the financial system, in two key ways. First, they help provide access to funds for those entities with illiquid mortgage-backed securities. This helps these entities avoid selling the MBS at a steep loss. Second, the available funds stimulate the commercial paper market and general economic activity. Specific responses by central banks are included in the subprime crisis impact timeline.

In November 2008, the Fed announced a $600 billion (~$834 billion in 2023) program to purchase the MBS of the GSE, to help lower mortgage rates.

== Broad-based programs ==
=== Term Auction Facility (TAF) ===
The Fed is using the Term Auction Facility to provide short-term loans (liquidity) to banks. The Fed increased the monthly amount of these auctions to $100 billion during March 2008, up from $60 billion in prior months. In addition, term repurchase agreements expected to cumulate to $100 billion were announced, which enhance the ability of financial institutions to sell mortgage-backed and other debt. The Fed indicated that both the TAF and repurchase agreement amounts will continue and be increased as necessary. During March 2008, the Fed also expanded the types of institutions to which it lends money and the types of collateral it accepts for loans.

=== Dollar Swap Lines ===
Dollar Swap Lines exchanged dollars with foreign central banks for foreign currency to help address disruptions in dollar funding markets abroad.

=== Term Securities Lending Facility (TSLF) ===
The Term Securities Lending Facility auctioned loans of U.S. Treasury securities to primary dealers against eligible collateral.

=== Primary Dealer Credit Facility (PDCF) ===
Concurrent to the collapse of Bear Stearns, the Fed announced the creation of a new lending facility, the Primary Dealer Credit Facility. The PDCF provided overnight cash loans to primary dealers against eligible collateral.

=== Asset-Backed Commercial Paper Money Market Mutual Fund Liquidity Facility (AMLF or ABCP MMMF) ===
The Asset-Backed Commercial Paper Money Market Mutual Fund Liquidity Facility provided loans to depository institutions and their affiliates to finance purchases of eligible asset-backed commercial paper from money market mutual funds.

=== Commercial Paper Funding Facility (CPFF) ===
On October 7, 2008, the Federal Reserve further expanded the collateral it will loan against, to include commercial paper. The action made the Fed a crucial source of credit for non-financial businesses in addition to commercial banks and investment firms. Fed officials said they'll buy as much of the debt as necessary to get the market functioning again. They refused to say how much that might be, but they noted that around $1.3 trillion worth of commercial paper would qualify. There was $1.61 (~$2.00 in 2023) trillion in outstanding commercial paper, seasonally adjusted, on the market as of October 1, 2008, according to the most recent data from the Fed. That was down from $1.70 trillion in the previous week. Since the summer of 2007, the market has shrunk from more than $2.2 trillion.

The Commercial Paper Funding Facility provided loans to a special purpose vehicle to finance purchases of new issues of asset-backed commercial paper and unsecured commercial paper from eligible issuers.

=== Term Asset-Backed Securities Loan Facility (TALF) ===
The Term Asset-Backed Securities Loan Facility provided loans to eligible investors to finance purchases of eligible asset-backed securities.

In November 2008, the Fed announced the $200 billion TALF. This program supported the issuance of asset-backed securities (ABS) collateralized by loans related to autos, credit cards, education, and small businesses. This step was taken to offset liquidity concerns.

In March 2009, the Fed announced that it was expanding the scope of the TALF program to allow loans against additional types of collateral.

== Assistance to Individual Institutions ==
=== Bear Stearns Companies, Inc. acquisition by JP Morgan Chase & Co. (JPMC) ===
In March 2008, the Fed provided funds and guarantees to enable bank J.P. Morgan Chase to purchase Bear Stearns, a large financial institution with substantial mortgage-backed securities (MBS) investments that had recently plunged in value. This action was taken in part to avoid a potential fire sale of nearly U.S. $210 billion of Bear Stearns' MBS and other assets, which could have caused further devaluation in similar securities across the banking system. In addition, Bear had taken on a significant role in the financial system via credit derivatives, essentially insuring against (or speculating regarding) mortgage and other debt defaults. The risk to its ability to perform its role as a counterparty in these derivative arrangements was another major threat to the banking system.

Programs included a Bridge Loan, an overnight loan provided to JPMC subsidiary, with which this subsidiary made a direct loan to Bear Stearns Companies, Inc, and Maiden Lane (I), a special purpose vehicle created to purchase approximately $30 billion of Bear Stearns's mortgage-related assets.

=== AIG Assistance ===
The Federal Reserve created five programs to give assistance to AIG:

1. Revolving Credit Facility, a revolving loan for the general corporate purposes of AIG and its subsidiaries, and to pay obligations as they came due.
2. Securities Borrowing Facility, which provided collateralized cash loans to reduce pressure on AIG to liquidate residential mortgage-backed securities (RMBS) in its securities lending portfolio.
3. Maiden Lane II, a special purpose vehicle created to purchase RMBS from securities lending portfolios of AIG subsidiaries.
4. Maiden Lane III, a special purpose vehicle created to purchase collateralized debt obligations on which AIG Financial Products had written credit default swaps.
5. Life Insurance Securitization, which was authorized to provide credit to AIG that would be repaid with cash flows from its life insurance businesses. It was never used.

=== Loans to affiliates of some primary dealers ===
The Federal Reserve provided loans to broker-dealer affiliates of four primary dealers on terms similar to those for PDCF.

=== Citigroup Inc. lending commitment ===
The Citigroup Inc. lending commitment was a commitment to provide non-recourse loan to Citigroup against ringfence assets if losses on asset pool reached $56.2 billion.

=== Bank of America Corporation lending commitment ===
The Bank of America Corporation lending commitment was a commitment to provide non-recourse loan facility to Bank of America if losses on ring fence assets exceeded $18 billion (agreement never finalized).
