= Economic impact of the COVID-19 pandemic in the United States =

- Map showing real GDP growth rates in 2020, as projected by the International Monetary Fund
- Date: February 2020–May 2023
- Type: Global recession
- Cause: COVID-19 pandemic–induced stock market crash and lockdown
- Outcome: Sharp rise in unemployment; Stress on supply chains; Decrease in government income; Collapse of the travel, tourism, and hospitality industries; Reduced consumer activity

The economic impact of the COVID-19 pandemic in the United States has been widely disruptive, adversely affecting travel, financial markets, employment, shipping, and other industries. The impacts can be attributed not just to government intervention to contain the virus (including at the federal and state level), but also to consumer and business behavior to reduce exposure to and spread of the deadly virus.

Real GDP contracted in 2020 by 3.5%, the first contraction since the 2008 financial crisis. Millions of workers were dislocated from their jobs, leading to multiple weeks of record shattering numbers of unemployment insurance applications. Consumer and retail activity contracted, with many businesses (especially restaurants) closing. Many businesses and offices transitioned to remote work to avoid the spread of COVID-19 at the office. Congress passed several pieces of legislation, such as the American Rescue Plan Act of 2021 to provide stimulus to mitigate the effect of workplace closures and income losses. The Federal Reserve reduced the federal funds rate target to nearly zero and introduced several liquidity facilities to keep financial markets functioning and to provide stimulus. In late 2021, inflation began to increase to levels not seen since the 1980s.

Recovery from the recession began relatively quickly, with the recession only lasting one quarter according to the NBER. As of 2022, the unemployment rate reached its pre-pandemic levels - nevertheless, in many key aspects and industries, the U.S. economy has not completely recovered from the COVID-19 pandemic.

A growing digital gap emerged in the United States following the pandemic, despite non-digital enterprises being more dynamic than in the European Union. In the United States, 48% of enterprises that were non-digital before to the pandemic began investing in digital technologies. 64% of firms that had previously implemented advanced digital technology also increased their investment in digitalisation. In the United States, 20% of jobs were found within firms that have not digitally transformed. According to a recent survey, these are called "sleepwalking firms", and are also more likely to pay lower wages and to create lower employment. These firms were also less likely to train their employees throughout the COVID-19 outbreak.

== Overview ==
In 2020, the U.S. GDP contracted at a 3.5% annualized rate. It was the biggest contraction since 1946 and the first contraction since 2009.

The United States Census Bureau's Household Pulse Survey published weekly statistics of the effects of the pandemic on Americans' lives. For week 12 (July 16–21), 51.1% of respondents reported a loss of employment income since March 13, 2020, 12.1% reported food scarcity, 40.1% delayed getting medical care in the past four weeks, and 26.5% reported housing insecurity.

=== Statistical summary ===
The following table illustrates the impact of the pandemic on key economic measures. February 2020 represented the pre-crisis level for most variables, with the S&P 500 stock market index (a leading indicator) falling from its February 19 peak. From February through June, the number of persons with jobs was down 14.6 million. The U.S. also added $3.1 trillion to the public debt in just 4 months.

Variable	Feb	Mar	Apr	May	June	July	August
Jobs, level (000s)	152,463	151,090	130,303	133,002	137,802	139,582	140,914
Jobs, monthly change (000s)	251	−1,373	−20,787	2,699	4,800	1,780	1,371
Unemployment rate %	3.5%	4.4%	14.7%	13.3%	11.1%	10.2%	8.4%
Number unemployed (millions)	5.8	7.1	23.1	21.0	17.8	16.3	13.6
Employment to population ratio %, age 25–54	80.5%	79.6%	69.7%	71.4%	73.5%	73.8%	75.3%
Inflation rate % (CPI-All)	2.3%	1.5%	0.4%	0.2%	0.7%	1.0%	TBD
Stock market S&P 500 (avg. level)	3,277	2,652	2,762	2,920	3,105	3,208	3,392
Debt held by public ($ trillion)	17.4	17.7	19.1	19.9	20.5	20.6	20.8

In October 2021, however, annual consumer price inflation reached 6.2%, the biggest rise in 31 years.

== Impact on individuals ==
=== Employment effects ===
==== Government statistics ====
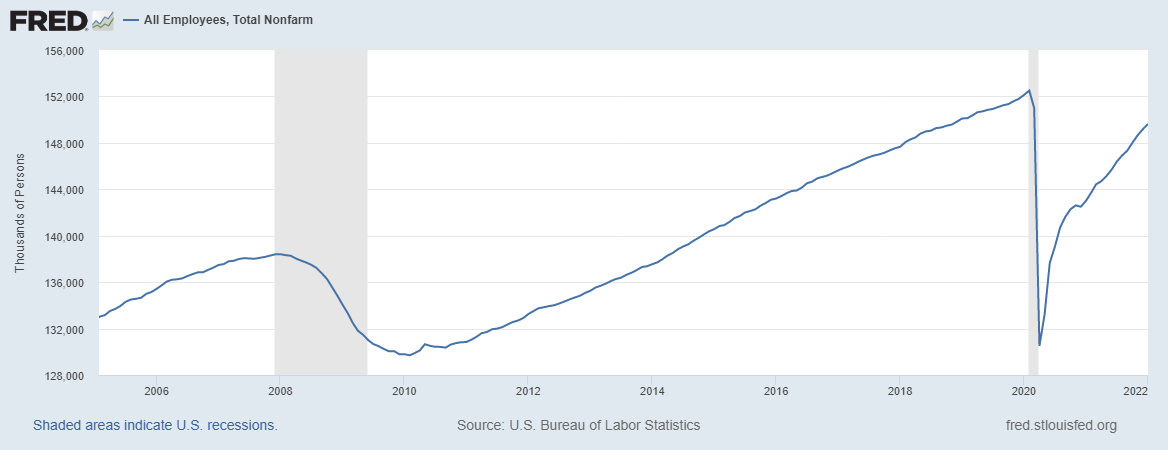
US non-farm payrolls, 2005 – January 2022

In the February 2020 jobs report, which reflected the employment situation before lockdowns began, 1.28 million Americans were classed as "permanent job losers". In August, that number was at 3.41 million, and in September it rose to 3.75 million. "Temporary layoffs", meanwhile, decreased, suggesting that some job losses originally understood as "temporary" had now become permanent.

On May 8, 2020, the Bureau of Labor Statistics reported that 20.5 million nonfarm jobs were lost and the unemployment rate rose to 14.7 percent in April. This followed reports of weekly initial claims for unemployment insurance that increased from a typical level of around 200,000 per week through early March, to 3.3 million the week of March 21, a peak of 6.9 million (March 28), and declines each week thereafter to 3.0 million the week of May 9. A total of 36.5 million filed for unemployment insurance from March 21 to May 9. The Congressional Budget Office estimated that costs for unemployment insurance claims were $49 billion in April 2020, versus $3 billion in April 2019. An estimated $27 billion of the increase was due to the $600/week increase in unemployment benefits due to the CARES Act.

On May 20, 2021, the Labor Department reported that there had been only 444,000 unemployment claims during the previous week, the lowest number since the beginning of the pandemic.

The United States depended on direct payments and loans to help individuals and businesses, regardless of whether jobs were retained. As a result, while aggregate hours worked decreased by around 15% in the United States and the European Union, unemployment increased significantly in the United States. However, in the United States, most firms that implemented digital technology were better able to avert worker reductions than non-digital firms.

==== Surveys and studies ====
In a paper published in early May 2020, the Urban Institute estimated that about 25 million people would lose their employer-provided health insurance if the unemployment rate were to rise to 20%. Of these, they speculated, 12 million would obtain Medicaid coverage, 6 million would find coverage privately, and 7 million would become uninsured.

By summer 2020, nearly two-thirds of households where an adult had contracted COVID-19 had also experienced job loss or a reduction in hours. Likewise, "serious financial problems" were reported by nearly two-thirds of those households, whereas such problems were reported by just under half of U.S. households overall, according to a survey by NPR, the Robert Wood Johnson Foundation, and the T.H. Chan School of Public Health at Harvard University that was conducted in July and August.

The impact of COVID-19 on employment varied widely across industries. For example, a study found that transportation workers were 20.6% more likely to be unemployed compared to those in other sectors, with specific sub-sectors like taxi drivers facing particularly severe job losses.

=== Eviction and foreclosure ===
The economic impact and mass unemployment caused by the COVID-19 pandemic raised fears of a mass eviction crisis, with an analysis by the Aspen Institute indicating between 19 and 23 million, or 1 in 5 renters, were at risk for eviction by the end of September 2020. A separate July 2021 United States Census Bureau survey projects 7 million households unable to pay rent and at risk of eviction, with a potential 3 million eviction filings in the next two months.

The federal CARES Act provided for a 120-day moratorium on evictions for federally backed properties, beginning on March 27 when the act was signed, and lasting til July 24 on eviction filings for rental units in properties that participate in federal assistance programs, or have a federally backed mortgage or multifamily mortgage loan. According to one estimate, this eviction moratorium covered 28% of all rental units in the United States; however, there were no enforcement mechanisms provided. A number of cities and states also passed rulings suspending evictions for varying amounts of time. When these moratoria ended in June and July 2020, evictions increased in many states and jurisdictions. A new nationwide moratorium was announced by the Centers for Disease Control began on September 1 which banned evictions for most renters for the rest of 2020.

The CARES Act also provided protection from foreclosure until August 31, 2020, for homeowners with federally backed mortgages. The CARES Act also allows mortgage holders the right to a mortgage forbearance for up to 180 days, with another 180 days on request. Several states also passed foreclosure moratoriums as well.

The United States Census Bureau uses their Household Pulse Survey to gather data on both monthly rent and mortgage payments during the pandemic. For the week of July 16–21, 2020, 8,251,079 homeowners of owner-occupied housing units did not make their mortgage payment on time and 4,473,321 deferred their payments, out of 148,685,473 surveyed. Similarly, 13,339,515 renters did not pay last month's rent, and 1,504,864 deferred their rent, out of 73,065,587 responses.

Homelessness had already been rising before the pandemic, with a 2% increase in the number of homeless people between January 2019 and January 2020.

=== Home sales ===
People who could afford to buy homes enjoyed the lowest mortgage interest rates since at least 1971. Home sales rose and showed a trend of people who could work from home moving out of expensive, large cities into smaller, lower-cost cities where they could afford larger homes with more on-site amenities. States like California and New York saw an exodus as a result of the pandemic. Housing prices rose amid a building boom as lumber futures reached an all-time high.

=== Food insecurity ===
Food insecurity across the United States rose significantly in 2020. Feeding America predicts that an additional 17 million people could become food insecure because of the pandemic, bringing the total to more than 54 million people in the country.

Before COVID-19, food insecurity was still prevalent, impacting 37 million people in the U.S. Since food insecurity and poor nutrition are "associated with chronic diseases that put people at higher risk for the more severe complications of COVID-19, the food access crisis has exacerbated the already glaring disparities in health outcomes for vulnerable people, including low-income people, children, older adults, and [undocumented immigrants living in the United States]." While the factors underlying racial and ethnic disparities are complex and multidimensional, disparities in food security have played a crucial role in the health inequities that have been witnessed during the pandemic. The ability to eat healthy, nutritious food depends on an individual's circumstances and environment.

The pandemic left millions of people in the U.S. at-risk when it comes to nutrition and overall health status. The pandemic complicated food insecurity among children, older adults, and undocumented immigrants. Feeding America stated that the estimated number of food-insecure kids could jump from 11 million to an estimated 18 million. Additionally, many children in the U.S. rely on free meals for sustenance. While food banks and pantries amped up services, the temporary disruption in these services could have devastating long-term consequences. Many seniors live on low and fixed incomes, resulting in decreased access to adequate nutrition and support services. Seniors are also particularly vulnerable to the devastating effects of COVID-19, leading many to avoid unnecessary visits to food pantries and health clinics. Undocumented immigrants are arguably the most vulnerable to food insecurity because they are ineligible for many government assistance programs. Even before the pandemic, 1 in 4 experienced food insecurity.

Food pantries encountered record numbers of clients, with many across the country serving 55 percent more people now than before the pandemic, according to Feeding America. The pandemic further stretched existing community resources, and it demonstrated the need for additional funding geared towards addressing the largest contributing factors of health – the social determinants of health.

== Impact by economic sector ==
=== Financial market impacts ===
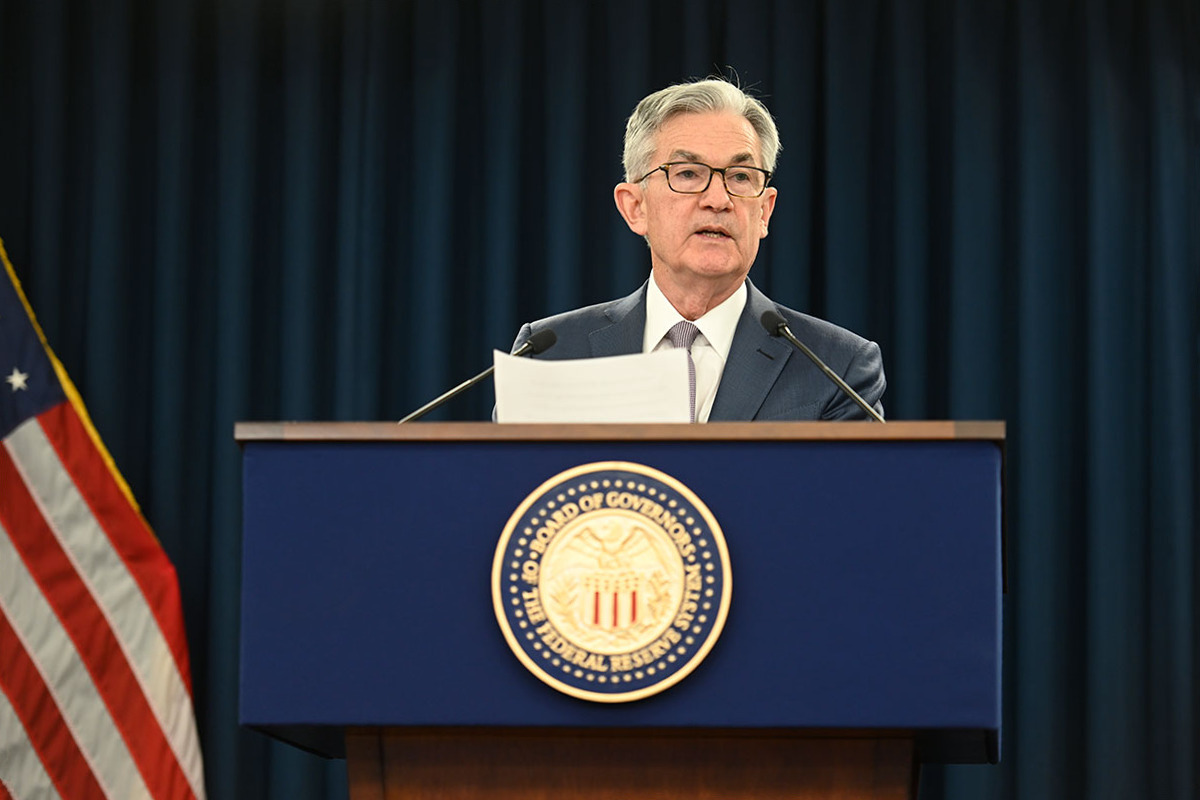
March 3: Federal Reserve chairman Jerome Powell announces a 50 basis point (0.5% percentage point) interest rate cut in light of "evolving risks to economic activity."

On February 27, 2020, the Dow Jones Industrial Average (DJIA) dropped 1,191 points, the largest single-day point drop in the index's history at the time; some attributed the drop to anxiety about the epidemic. The same day, the S&P 500 logged a 4.4% decline. The record was beaten five more times during the outbreak on March 9 (2,013), March 11 (1,465), March 12 (2,353), and finally set the current record for most points lost in a single day by losing 2,997 points on March 16. It once again fell another 1,338 points on March 18. On March 13, the stock market rebounded for the single largest one-day point gain in the market's history by gaining 1,985 points after Trump declared a state of national emergency to free up resources to combat the virus. The six business days it took for the S&P 500 Index to drop 10% (from February 20 to 27) "marked the quickest 10% decline from an all-time high in the index's history." From January 21 to March 1, the DJIA dropped more than 3,500 points, equating to roughly a 13% decrease.

Stock index futures declined sharply during Trump's March 11 address, and the Dow Jones declined 10% the following day—the largest daily decline since Black Monday in 1987—despite the Federal Reserve also announcing it would inject $1.5 trillion into money markets. By March 18, investors were shunning even assets considered safe havens during economic crises, such as government bonds and gold, moving into cash positions. By March 20, the Dow Jones was below the level when President Trump was inaugurated on January 20, 2017, having fallen 35% from its February peak. The markets rallied between March 23 and 26, with the Dow having its best three-day gain since 1931. On March 27, the Dow fell 3.5% and the S&P 500 fell 3.2%. The NASDAQ Index also fell. Boeing fell 10%, while Exxon and Disney each fell 6%.

In February 2020, the American companies Apple Inc. and Microsoft began lowering expectations for revenue because of supply chain disruptions in China caused by the virus. In a February 27 note to clients, Goldman Sachs said it expects no earnings growth for U.S. companies in 2020 as a result of the virus, at a time when the consensus forecast of Wall Street expected "earnings to climb 7%." On March 20, 2020, as part of an SEC filing, AT&T cancelled all stock buyback plans included a plan to repurchase stock worth $4 billion during the second quarter. The reasons AT&T gave for the cancellation was to invest the money into its networks and in taking care of its employees during the pandemic.

In response to the economic damage caused by the pandemic, some economists have advocated for financial support from the government for individual Americans and for banks and businesses. Financial analyst Karen Petrou objected to government intervention on the grounds that it would alter the role of the Federal Reserve and enshrine moral hazard as a defining market principle.

Several officials faced allegations of insider trading, citing sales of their stock portfolios that coincided with private briefings and other statements regarding COVID-19, and almost immediately preceding a major stock market crash on February 20. Senate Intelligence Committee chairman Richard Burr sold up to $1.7 million of stocks while making public statements of reassurances of the government's level of COVID-19 preparedness. Georgia senator Kelly Loeffler sold tens of millions of dollars' worth of stocks after a closed briefing on the COVID-19. Senator Dianne Feinstein, a member of the Senate intelligence committee, sold between $1.5m and $6m in stock of Allogene Therapeutics, a biotechnology company. U.S. Representative Nancy Pelosi's husband purchased $3.3 million worth of technology stocks expected to surge during a lockdown. On May 14, after having had a warrant served against him by the FBI, Burr announced that he would step down from his position during the investigation.

In 2021, 79% of US firms stated that the COVID-19 pandemic will have a long-term influence on requirements and priorities in investment.

The supply of coins in the U.S. banking system was lowered to the point of rationing, due to many stores being closed, many coin-counting machines being unavailable, and fewer coins produced by the U.S. mint to protect employees.

However, as the economy recovered from COVID-19, some such as J.P. Morgan Chase strategist Marko Kolanovic expected the U.S. stock market surge that happened since the trough to continue into 2021.

=== Global supply chain ===
Due to lockdowns, the global trade volume were contracted by 16% in the first two quarters of 2020. The effects on the global supply chain were devastating, as the production of raw materials, intermediate goods, and finished goods suddenly became scarce due to labor shortages. Companies that rely on the technique of Just-In-Time (JIT) experienced significant inventory shortages. While JIT is an effective method that reduces excess inventories and relieves costs for companies, it increases firms' vulnerability to supply shocks.

Supply chain resilience became a higher priority for firms after the pandemic, with 80% of firms viewing supply chain resilience as a top priority. Many firms began thinking to switch their inventory management from JIT to Just-In-Case in case of another supply-chain shock. Relative to firms that purchase domestically, importing firms significantly increased their inventories after the pandemic.

=== Energy sector ===
The U.S. oil, gas and chemicals industry lost 107,000 jobs between March and August 2020, according to Deloitte. When demand for jet fuel, diesel and gasoline suddenly dropped, oil was in oversupply.

=== Health care sector ===
==== Production of emergency supplies ====
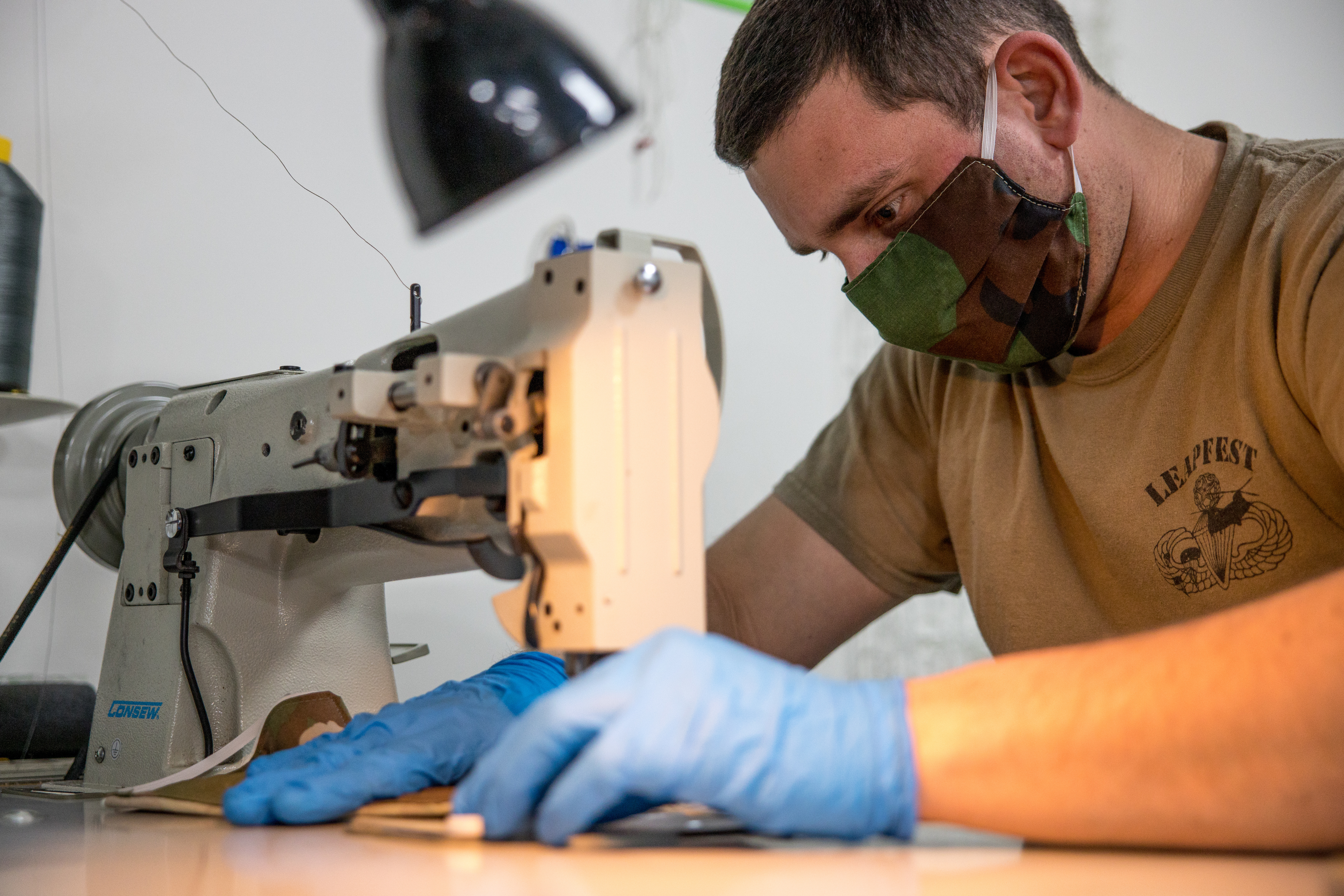
A Rhode Island National Guardsman sews cloth face masks on April 6, 2020.

In response to shortages, some alcoholic beverage facilities started manufacturing and distributing alcohol-based hand sanitizer. General Motors opened its manufacturing, logistics, and purchasing infrastructure for use by Ventec, a Washington State manufacturer of medical ventilators. As medical mask manufacturers hired hundreds of new workers and increased output, in response to urgent requests from hospital workers, volunteers with home sewing machines started producing thousands of non-medical masks which can be sterilized and re-used. Fabric was bought privately or donated by Joann Fabrics. The CDC recommended the use of homemade masks (preferably in combination with a full-face splash shield) only as a "last resort" when no other respiratory protective technologies were available, including reused professional masks. Bauer Hockey began manufacturing face shields for medical applications on March 26.

Some U.S. officials and commentators criticized the outsourcing of critical materials—like the production of essential medical supplies—to China.

===== International aid =====
Chinese billionaire Jack Ma donated COVID-19 test kits and face masks to the United States. The Russian government sent a cargo plane with ventilators and face masks.

==== Surge in medical personnel ====
Several states and non-profit groups started recruiting retired medical personnel to increase staffing in hospitals and at temporary facilities. Some jurisdictions granted emergency medical licenses to inactive doctors, and incoming resident doctors and interns, and expanded the tasks that nurses were allowed to do.

==== Telemedicine ====
The COVID-19 pandemic led to a sharp increase in the use of telemedical services in the United States, specifically for COVID-19 screening and triage. As of March 29, 2020, three companies offered free telemedical screenings for COVID-19 in the United States: K Health (routed through an AI chatbot), Ro (routed through an AI chatbot), and GoodRx (offered through its HeyDoctor platform).

=== Meat industry ===
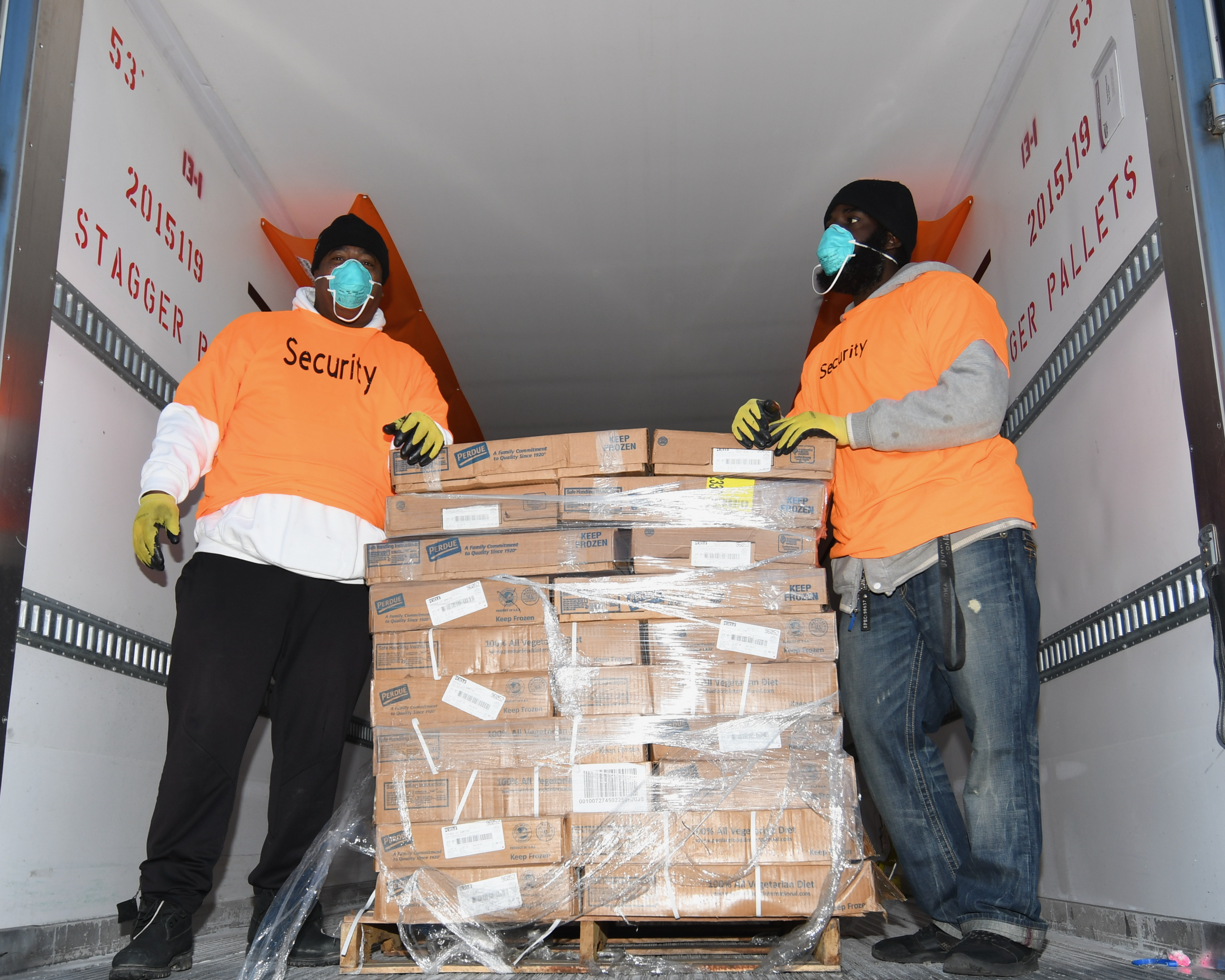
May 8, 2020: Distribution of frozen chicken to those in need in Baltimore, Maryland

Meatpacking plants experienced sporadic shutdowns as many workers contracted COVID-19, resulting in spot meat shortages around the country.

According to the Centers for Disease Control and Prevention issued a report stating that by April 27, out of 130,578 workers nationwide, at least 4,913 meat and poultry plant workers had COVID-19. Cases were reported in 115 plants located in 19 states, and at least 20 people had died. At least 2 USDA meat inspectors died of COVID-19, 137 tested positive, and 704 others refused to work due to lack of protective equipment in a high-risk environment.

As of April 22, 2020, about 25% of the pork processing capacity of the nation had been cut. Beginning in late March 2020, weekly beef production was down 19% year-over-year. As the fastest-growing mass-market meat animal in the United States, chickens were the most vulnerable to farms running out of capacity to hold an excess population. At least two million chickens were euthanized on farms in Delaware and Maryland rather than slaughtered for meat, due to lack of capacity to process them for human consumption.

By May 5, around 18% of Wendy's restaurants (concentrated in certain geographic areas of the country) were unable to serve beef sandwiches, but still had chicken available. Wendy's uses fresh beef; in contrast, McDonald's, which uses frozen beef, was unaffected. Supermarket and big box chains Kroger, Wegmans, Costco, Whole Foods, ShopRite, Sam's Club, Stop and Shop, Price Chopper Supermarkets, and others started limiting the amount of meat purchased per customer. Hundreds of millions of pounds of beef and pork remain in cold storage, originally intended for restaurants; the USDA started allowing this meat to be sold at grocery stores, though it must be cut down by store workers into consumer-sized packages.

=== Restaurant industry ===
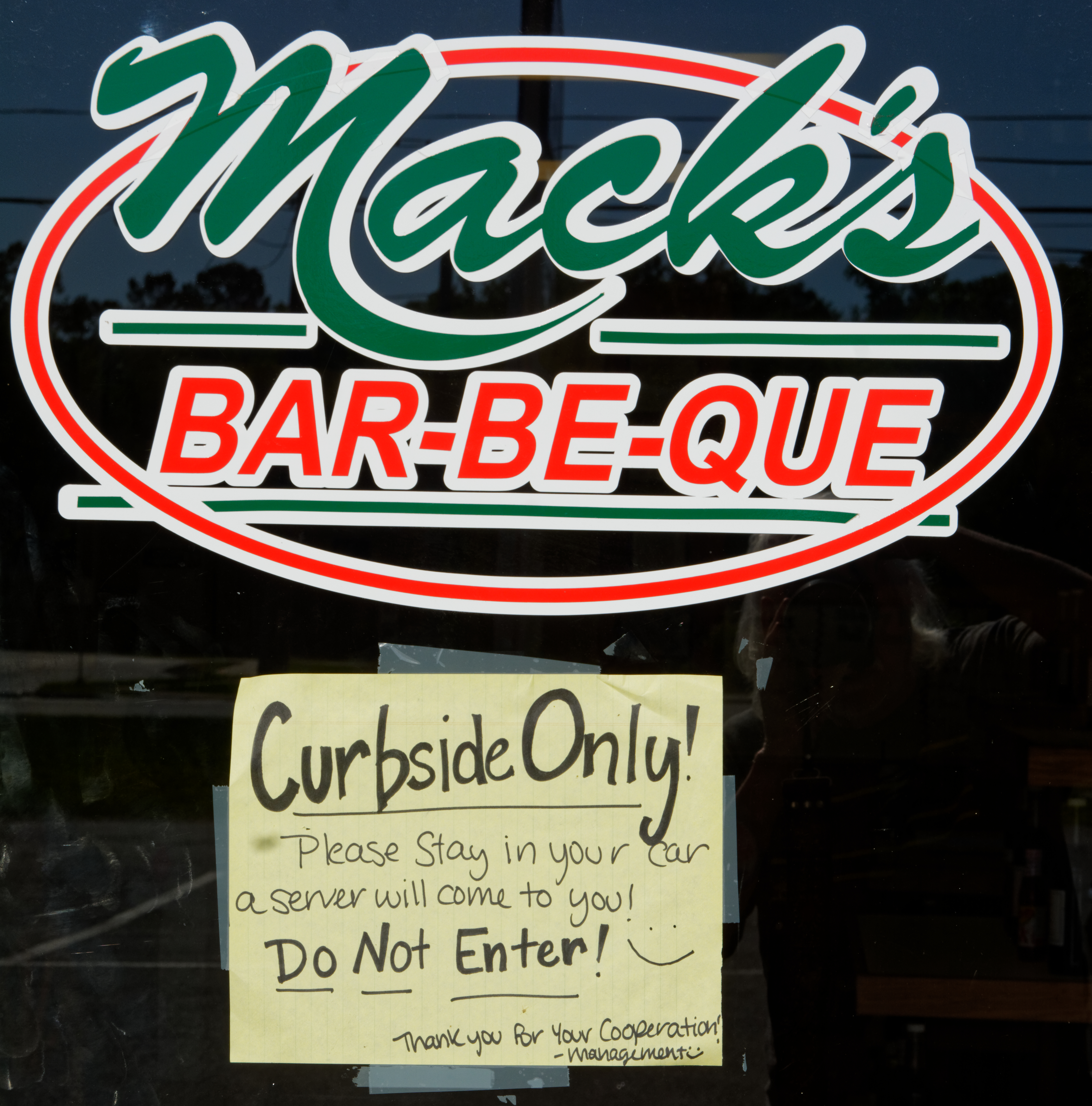
May 11, 2020: sign for curbside restaurant service only in Brunswick, Georgia

The U.S. restaurant industry was projected to have $899 billion in sales for 2020 by the National Restaurant Association, the main trade association for the industry in the United States. The industry as a whole as of February 2020 employed more than 15 million people, representing 10 percent of the workforce directly. It indirectly employed close to another ten percent when dependent businesses such as food producers, trucking, and delivery services were factored in.

On March 15, Ohio Governor Mike DeWine and Ohio Health Department director Amy Acton ordered the closure of all bars and restaurants, saying the government "encouraged restaurants to offer carryout or delivery service, but they would not be allowed to have people congregating in the businesses." The next day, Illinois, New York, New Jersey, and Maryland followed suit.

Groups of restaurateurs in New York City and Cincinnati called on governments to provide help to the nation's small and independent restaurants. On March 19 the New York group called for state governments to issue orders for rent abatements, suspension of sales and payroll taxes, and a full shutdown so business interruption insurance coverage would be triggered. On March 20 the Cincinnati group called on the federal government to provide a $225 billion bailout to the restaurant industry.

Several restaurant chains altered their operating procedures to prevent the spread of the virus, including removing seating, restricting the use of condiments, and switching to mobile payment systems. Many restaurants opted to close their dining rooms and instead switch to solely take-out food service to comply with physical distancing recommendations.

According to the National Restaurant Association, 60% of restaurant owners did not think the relief programs would be enough to keep employees on payroll. Restaurants reported $30 billion in losses in March.

=== Office workers ===
By 2022, even though it was possible to bring employees back full-time, the necessity of working from home during the pandemic proved to many employers that it was feasible, and many office workers preferred to continue working from home several days a week. Most chose to extend weekends and work from home Monday and Friday. This leaves Tuesday, Wednesday, and Thursday as high-traffic days in downtown office districts, and negatively impacting patronage at businesses that serve office workers, such as lunch restaurants. More businesses began providing free food at offices in order to entice workers to return in person. Some companies reconfigured their office spaces to avoid paying for unused desk space. This included leasing out empty space to other companies, and allocating more space to hot desks.

=== Retail ===
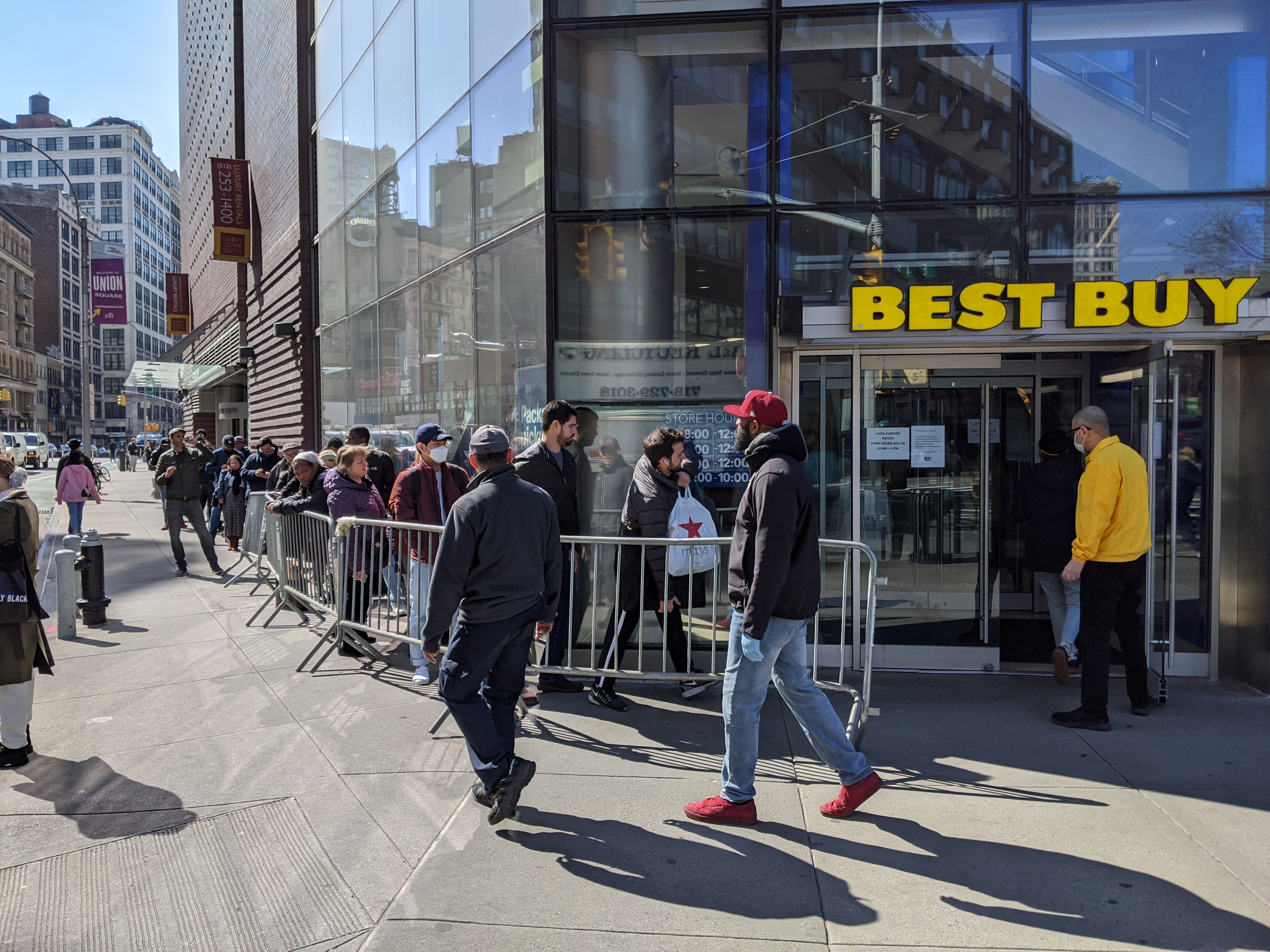
March 18: Best Buy lets only a limited number of people into their Union Square store in New York City.

A number of retailers, particularly grocery stores, reduced their opening hours to allow additional time to restock and deep-clean their stores. Major stores such as Walmart, Apple, Nike, Albertsons, and Trader Joe's also shortened their hours. Some grocery store chains, including Meijer, Stop & Shop and Dollar General, devoted a portion of their operating hours to serve only senior citizens. Many grocery stores and pharmacies began installing plexiglass sneeze guards at register areas to protect cashiers and pharmacists, and adding markers six feet apart at checkout lines to encourage customers to maintain physical distance. To prevent hoarding, many supermarkets and retailers placed limits on certain products such as toilet paper, hand sanitizer, over-the-counter medication, and cleaning supplies. However, the Food Marketing Institute announced that its supply chain was not strained and all products would be available in the future. Major retail chains started hiring tens of thousands of employees to keep up with demand, including Walmart (150,000), CVS Pharmacy (50,000), Dollar General (50,000), and 7-Eleven (20,000). Sheetz convenience stores began offering free meals to children in need at select stores in Maryland, North Carolina, Ohio, Pennsylvania and West Virginia. A daily senior shopping hour, checkout line distancing markers, hand washing and sanitizer for employees, disinfecting wipes for customers to use on carts, and a ban on reusable bags became mandatory in Massachusetts on March 25. Many stores began limiting the number of people inside at a time, to increase the typical distance between customers, resulting in outdoor lines with people spaced six feet apart.

Retail sales fell 8.3% in March and 16.4% in April, according to the Commerce Department. The hardest-hit sectors included home furnishings (down by two-thirds over these two months) and clothing (down 89% over these two months).

Milk delivery services experienced demand which significantly exceeded pre-existing capacity.

On June 19, 2020, about a month after starting to reopen their outlets in the US, Apple temporarily closed 11 retail stores across Arizona, Florida, North Carolina, and South Carolina due to rising numbers of COVID-19 cases.

In July 2020, the largest supermarket chain in the country, Kroger, stopped giving coins as change. Because the U.S. Mint had decreased coin production to protect its employees during the pandemic, and because banks were giving fewer coins to the Federal Reserve, Kroger had difficulty obtaining enough coins for its business. (Instead, Kroger offered to make charitable donations or to issue store credit to the customer.)

On June 13, 2021, the Washington Prime Group, an owner of over 100 U.S. shopping malls, filed for bankruptcy.

=== Seafood industry ===
The COVID-19 pandemic affected fishing and seafood industries worldwide beginning with the temporary lockdown and closing of all but essential businesses. This affected restaurants, which are where 80% of fish and seafood consumption takes place in the U.S. Disruption to seafood exports resulted in cancelled orders to both national and overseas purchases. Many fisheries became unprofitable and seafood export and import outlets were shuttered, with fishing crews and seafood processing workers being driven into finding other work as market dries up.

President Trump also issued an executive order proposing U.S. farm-raised fish and shellfish as the new suitable form of seafood consumption in the United States. The executive order was meant to "encourage public-private partnerships and promote inter-agency, intergovernmental, and international cooperation in order to improve global maritime domain awareness… and economic growth," as well as strengthening national export and decreasing foreign competition.

The pandemic impacted seafood supply chains on every level, from fisherfolk and coastal communities to large scale processors, distributors, foodservice buyers, and consumers. Many seafood commodities suffered from unprecedented drops in market value and the communities that capture and produce these commodities were significantly disrupted. A variety of policy approaches balancing public and economic health were implemented in response. On May 7, 2020, the US Secretary of Commerce announced an amendment to Sec. 12005 of the COVID-19 Aid, Relief, and Economic Security Act allocating $300 million in financial assistance to COVID-19 affected coastal and fishery communities. On the same day, President Trump enacted the Executive Order on Promoting American Seafood Competitiveness and Economic Growth. The order aims to increase the competitiveness of the American seafood industry via deregulation. Under the order, all eight Regional Fishery Management Councils must provide policy recommendations to "reduce burdens on domestic fishing" and initiate these recommendations by May 7, 2021.

=== Shipping and mail ===
With consumers increasingly relying on online retailers, Amazon planned to hire another 100,000 warehouse and delivery workers and raise wages $2 per hour through April 2020. They also reported shortages of certain household staples. At its warehouses, Amazon stopped exit screenings, as well as group meetings at the beginning of shifts, and staggered shift times and break times. The company also announced it would provide up to two weeks of pay to all employees diagnosed with COVID-19 or placed into quarantine, but presumably not for employees who merely had symptoms of fever and cough. Amazon workers complained paid medical leave was difficult to obtain because of limited access to COVID-19 testing, and some petitioned the company to extend paid leave to elderly and medically vulnerable workers without a positive test. As small numbers of workers tested positive for COVID-19, various Amazon warehouses closed for sanitization, including one in Kentucky for several days. Amazon workers at the Staten Island warehouse and some Instacart workers nationwide separately announced strikes for March 30, demanding access to PPE, better sick pay, hazard pay for Instacart orders, and a longer closure of the Staten Island warehouse for cleaning. From March 1 to September 19, 2020, nearly 20,000 of Amazon's U.S. employees tested positive or were presumed positive.

The Chicago Tribune reported in March 2020 that employees at UPS, FedEx, and XPO, Inc. were often pressured not to take time off, even with symptoms such as fever and cough consistent with COVID-19. Public health authorities stated the risk was relatively low to customers receiving packages, in part because COVID-19 does not live for very long on cardboard, but infection most certainly was a danger for employees working beside crowded conveyor belts.

UPS and FedEx suspended all delivery time guarantees but continued domestic pickups and deliveries. Some international private package deliveries were delayed, while others were completely suspended due to government shutdowns in other countries.

Domestic package delivery continued, with two- and three-day package delivery guarantees extended by one day, due to lack of affordable domestic cargo transportation (presumably due to cancellation of most passenger airline flights). A large amount of mail was held due to sustained business shutdowns, with the USPS extending the time period before returning to sender. The USPS stopped accepting international mail for many countries, either due to suspension of service in the destination country or lack of affordable transportation. Some military and diplomatic mail destinations were also shut down. Some mail destined for Europe was diverted from air to sea transport, with a small number of containers sent by ships departing from the JFK International Service Center in New York for Rotterdam on April 20 and April 27, 2020.

Some postal workers complained of lack of social distancing at work and outages of supplies, including masks, gloves, and rubber bands.

In response to the workplace hazards associated with handling and delivering returned packages, some companies instituted policies meant to minimize risk to both workers and customers. Examples include extending the amount of time allotted to customers to return an item, allowing customers to return an item to a physical location even if they purchased it online, and quarantining returned packages for at least one day upon arrival in the warehouse.

==== Financial impact on the U.S. Postal Service ====
Ultimately, the pandemic contributed to an increase in e-commerce. By mid-April 2020, with many businesses dropping advertising campaigns or closing completely, the United States Postal Service (USPS) experienced a 30% drop in volume and projected a $13 billion loss in revenue for 2020. The service was reluctant to accept a $10 billion loan allocated by the CARES Act because it would increase already high debt levels and give too much control to the U.S. Treasury, possibly advancing the Trump administration's plan to privatize the postal service. It requested $89 billion in grant aid from Congress. The initially projected 2020 losses did not occur. In the fiscal year 2020, compared to the previous year, the amount of mail sent by the USPS grew 18.8 percent and operating revenue increased nearly $2 billion.

=== Travel industry ===
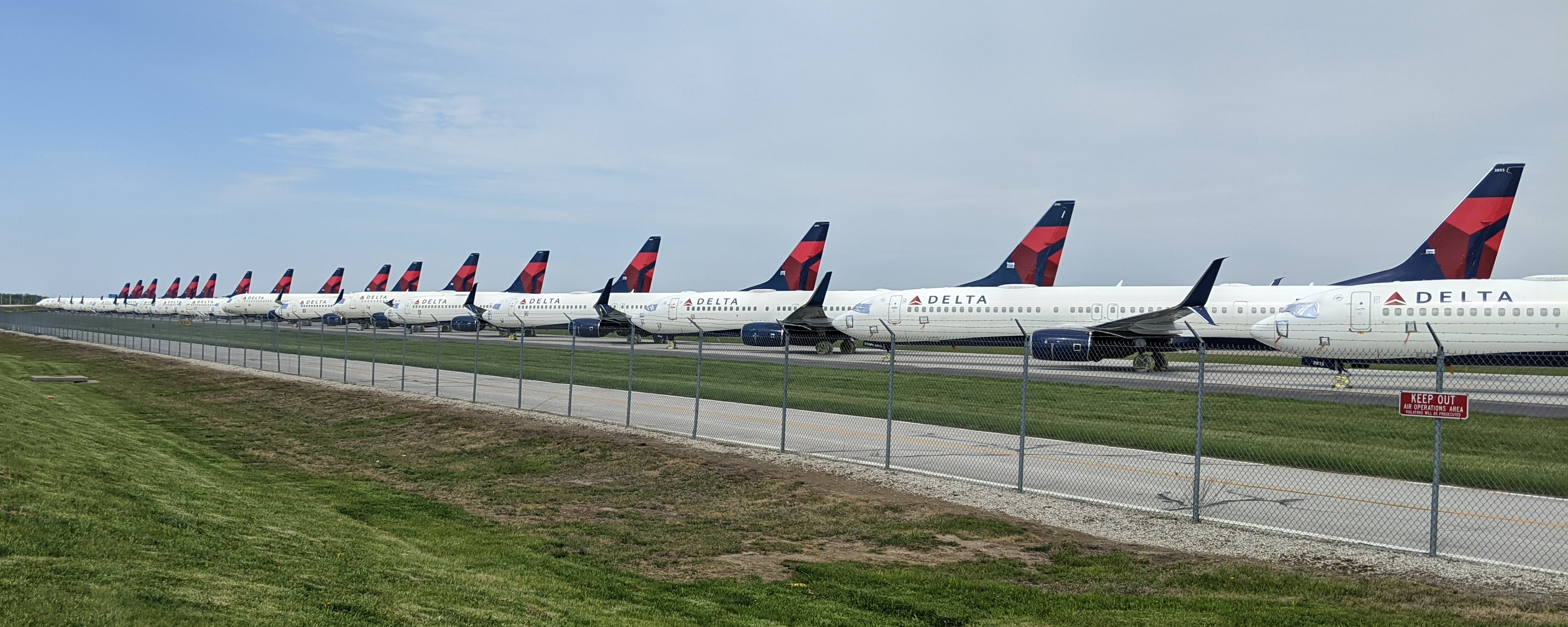
Delta Air Lines planes parked on a taxiway at Kansas City International Airport. The planes are parked due to the sharp decrease in demand for air travel.

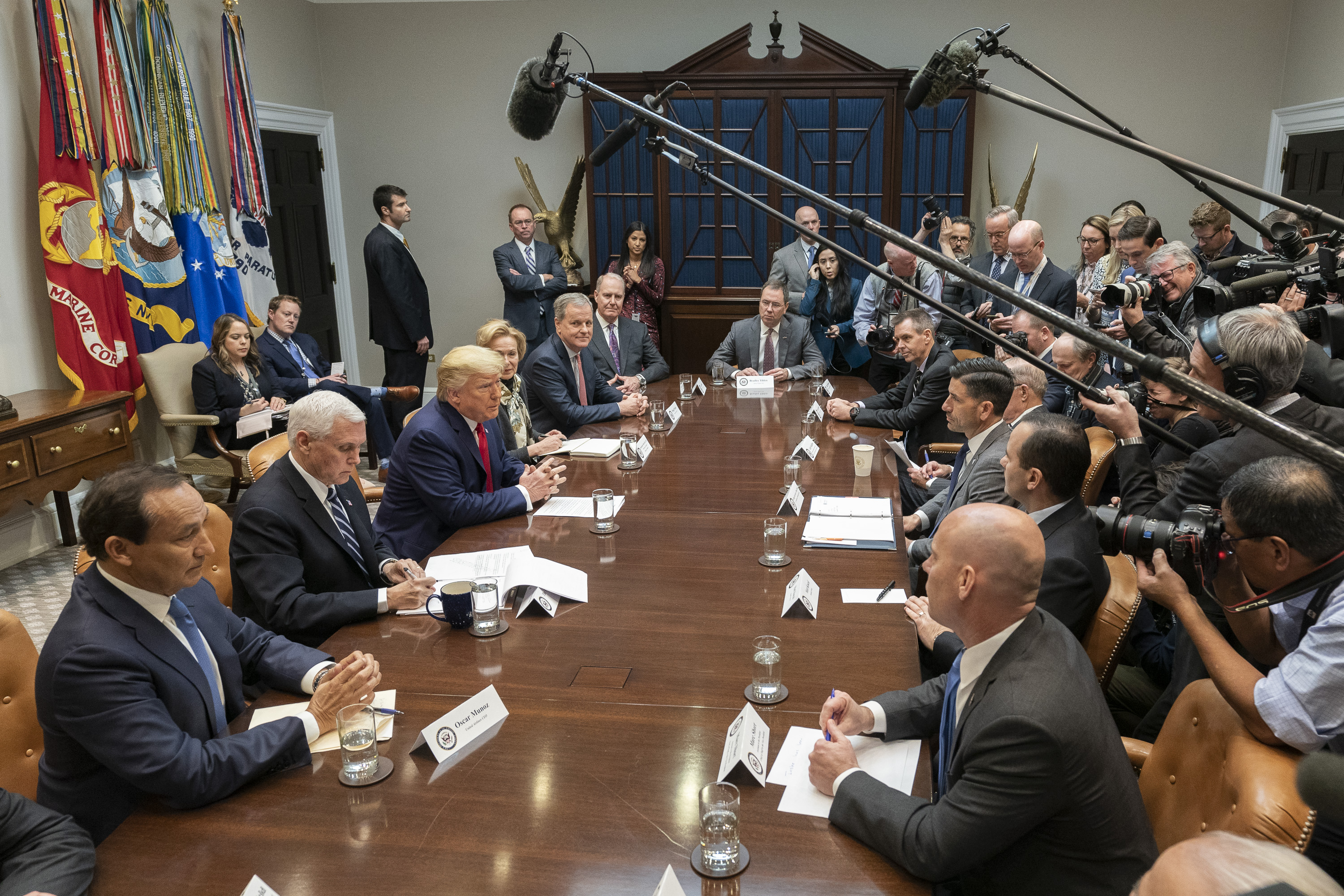
March 4: President Trump and Airline CEOs discuss COVID-19's impact on the travel industry.

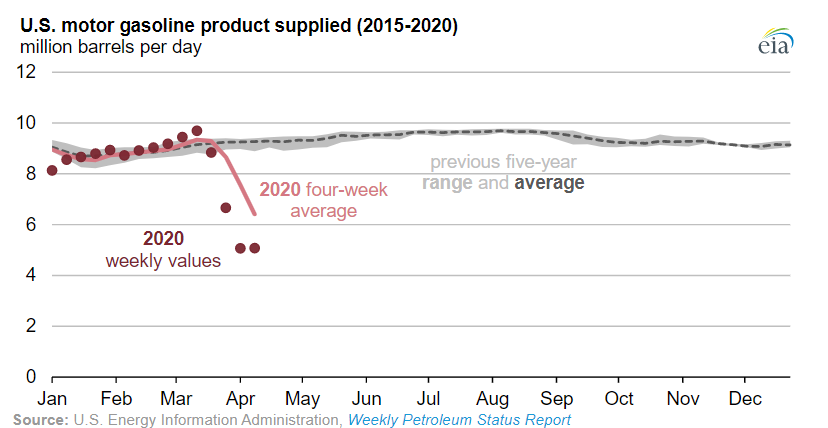
Demand for motor gasoline fell sharply.

In mid-March, most major American and foreign airlines began cutting back on domestic and international flights as a result of the sudden drop in travel demand from the pandemic and subsequent travel bans, phasing out some routes entirely. Cruise lines suspended all departures from the United States on March 14.

The outbreak produced occasional disruptions to air traffic control with area control centers in New York and Indianapolis, and airport towers at Midway International Airport in Chicago and McCarran International Airport in Las Vegas evacuated for sterilization after at least one person who had been in each tested positive for COVID-19.

On March 14, Amtrak reduced its service between Washington and Boston as the COVID-19 outbreak drastically decreased travel demand. It faced steep revenue losses during the crisis. It also asked noncritical employees "to take time off on an unpaid basis." By the following week, New York's subways, usually the nation's busiest, were running mostly empty, which had the Metropolitan Transportation Authority using $1 billion from its line of credit to stay afloat.

The lobbying group for the airline industry, Airlines for America (A4A), on March 16 called for a $50 billion subsidy, including $4 billion for cargo services. CNBC reported that airlines were preparing for a ban on domestic flights after President Trump said on March 14 he was considering travel curbs and acting DHS Secretary Chad Wolf said all options remained on the table when asked about a possible ban, the first since the September 11 attacks in 2001. United Airlines said they expected a drop of $1.5 billion in March revenue, American Airlines said they expected to decrease domestic capacity by 20% in April and 30% in May, and Delta Air Lines told employees it would cut capacity by 40%.

=== Transport and transport safety ===
Covid has had many effects on transport: reduction of traffic, increase of speed, increase of extreme speeding, increase in commercial shipping activity, increase dependence as a commercial vehicle society, increase working hours for truckers, and increase death rates per motor vehicle accident in the United States. The freight industry experienced a shortage of truck drivers, and freight rates rose higher than 2019 levels. Supply problems and sudden demand for socially-distanced recreation and alternatives to public transport caused a shortage of bicycles.

=== Commercial real estate ===
The pandemic reduced the value of office properties in New York City by as much as $28 billion.

=== Pandemic-related fraud ===
The vast increase in the flow of federal funds to American citizens (via the CARES Act and related measures) resulted in a corresponding increase in benefits fraud, both from businesses and individuals. In the largest individual case, Feeding Our Future, dozens of individuals conspired to receive nearly $250 million in USDA child nutrition funds while failing to actually provide meals to children. Nationwide, as of 2025, more than 4200 Americans had been federally charged with pandemic fraud, leading to more than 2400 convictions and $2 billion in recovered funds and forfeitures.

== The Federal Reserve's Response ==
The Federal Reserve ("the Fed") has a dual mandate: [1] keep prices stable, [2] maximize unemployment. During the COVID-19 crisis, the Federal Reserve (Fed) used both monetary policy and its lender of the last resort role to prevent the economy falling into a deeper recession. In March 2020, the federal funds rate was lowered by a total of 1.5 points, resulting in a rate of 0% to 0.25%. By reducing the funds rate, banks are able to borrow funds overnight from other banks with lower cost. The goal was to prevent the economy falling into a deflationary spiral by stimulating spending and investment.

Furthermore, the Fed also gave foreign banks access to borrow from the discount window which they had not been able to before. Several emergency lending facilities such as the Primary Dealer Credit Facility (PDCF) and the Money Market Mutual Fund Liquidity Facility (MMLF) were created or relaunched to provide short-term loans to firms. Term-Asset Backed Securities Loan Facility (TALF) lent $4.1 billion in asset-backed securities (ABS) to financially support households, consumers, and businesses.

The Fed also used another tool called "quantitative easing" (QE). This tool is used when conventional monetary policy is no longer effective, typically when interest rates are already in the zero lower bound. Quantitative easing further increases liquidity by making large-scale purchases of treasury securities and mortgage backed securities (MBS). In March 2020, the Fed announced to purchased at least $500 billions of Treasuries and $200 billion worth of MBS, equivalent to 3.3% of the U.S. GDP. An estimated 4.70 trillion was spent on asset purchases, liquidity measures, lending facilities, and other loan purchase programs. QE purchases ultimately resulted in a lower in long term yield, flattening the yield curve to lower borrowing costs for households and businesses.

In addition, the Fed also provided forward guidance. In September 2020, the Fed committed to keep interest rates low until the inflation rate is backed to its target and employment is maximized. The purpose of forward guidance is to manage public expectation about future rates in order to encourage borrowing and spending during economic crisis.

== Macroeconomic analysis during the COVID-19 pandemic in the United States ==
=== Critical context ===
In late 2019, the first case of SARS-CoV-2 was recorded in Wuhan (China). From that moment, speculations regarding the economy began to fluctuate worldwide, as there was not the slightest idea of the massive global impact it would cause.

In the United States, the economic outlook right before the arrival of COVID-19 showed a significant boom: the country was in a period of notable financial stability and optimism, enjoying the longest bull market in its history, stretching from the end of the 2008 financial crisis to the end of 2019. They were also at full employment, meaning the labor market was at one of its best moments, with a 3.5% unemployment rate in February 2020. Likewise, at that time there was confidence and optimism based on the progress of trade negotiations between the United States and China, as well as controlled inflation, with stable prices and central banks focused on sustaining growth.

However, the sudden shock to the US economy occurred in March 2020, with the market collapse: stock indices suffered an abrupt fall, recording their worst quarter since the Great Recession, as uncertainty about the virus's reach triggered massive risk aversion. There was also a paralysis of supply and demand, as new lockdown measures, along with social distancing, halted essential activities, collapsing many sectors (restaurants, hotels, tourism, etc.).

The government, alongside the Federal Reserve, responded to this abrupt shift in the national economy by deploying an unprecedented battery of fiscal and monetary measures to counteract the situation.

==== The role of institutions ====
The role of the United States government during the onset of the pandemic was one of the most decisive, both due to its magnitude and the speed at which it was implemented. Faced with the imminent risk of a systemic collapse, the government acted using two main levers: fiscal policy by Congress and monetary policy by the Federal Reserve.

In fiscal policy, Congress passed rescue packages on a scale never seen before to keep the real economy afloat, prioritizing liquidity for households and businesses. The monetary policy applied by the Federal Reserve aimed to ensure that the financial system did not freeze due to a lack of cash, since the total shutdown of many businesses in sectors affected by lockdown measures completely halted the economy for many households. On April 9, 2020, the Federal Reserve announced additional measures to provide up to $2.3 trillion in loans to support the economy.

Finally, the State also made decisions to change operations and regulations, adapting the operational framework to allow the survival of key industries. Among these was the suspension of obligations, with a 120-day eviction moratorium on rent payments for federally backed properties established by the CARES Act itself, and later a broader order from the Centers for Disease Control and Prevention (CDC), effective September 4, 2020. Similarly, federal student loan payments and interest were paused to give citizens a financial breather. Furthermore, there was massive support for critical sectors such as air transport, which received specific aid packages under the condition of not carrying out mass layoffs, recognizing their strategic importance to national infrastructure.

=== Execution ===
Fiscal policy relied on various laws to execute a rescue of the real economy on an unprecedented scale. On March 27, 2020, the CARES Act (Public Law 116-136) was enacted, serving as the central pillar: it allocated a total of approximately $2.2 trillion in spending, tax relief, and loans. This law provided direct payments to citizens, expanded unemployment benefits, and created the Paycheck Protection Program to prevent layoffs in small businesses.

For its part, the Federal Reserve cut the benchmark interest rate to a range of 0%-0.25% on March 15, 2020, and launched a $700 billion quantitative easing program purchasing Treasury bonds and mortgage-backed securities. In addition, it launched several relief mechanisms to maintain the flow of credit to state governments, mid-sized businesses, and corporations, facilitating dollar swap lines with other central banks.

=== Short and long-term results and effects ===
The results of the economic response to COVID-19 in the United States can be divided into the immediate containment of the disaster and the structural aftermath left by the implemented policies.

In the short term (2020-2021), the goal was to prevent the health crisis from turning into a prolonged economic depression. This was achieved thanks to direct stimulus checks and bolstered unemployment insurance: households maintained their consumption capacity, which prevented a total collapse in aggregate demand. Likewise, through the Paycheck Protection Program (PPP), millions of small businesses managed to keep their employees, avoiding mass layoffs. The United States experienced a significant "rebound" after the initial 2020 shutdown: the liquidity injection was so powerful that, by the second quarter of 2021, real GDP had already surpassed its pre-pandemic level.

In the long term (2022-present), the aggressiveness of the measures had side effects that changed the US economic landscape. There was persistent inflation: the massive injection of money, in a context of broken supply chains, caused the highest inflationary peak in four decades, with the consumer price index reaching 9.1% year-over-year in June 2022. This forced the Fed to make sharp pivots in its monetary policy, aggressively raising interest rates starting in 2022 to cool down the economy. Additionally, there was a heavy burden of public debt, as the accumulated fiscal deficit pushed the national debt to historic levels. Finally, the pandemic accelerated trends like remote work and digitalization, but it also caused mismatches and a greater demand for flexibility from workers.

=== Decision-making critique ===
The governmental role was defined by the maxim of "spend first, ask questions later". The underlying philosophy was that it would be much more costly and traumatic to allow businesses to go bankrupt and workers to be left completely helpless, than to incur a massive fiscal deficit to cushion the blow.

While these measures prevented an immediate collapse, they also laid the groundwork for the economic challenges that followed, including the significant increase in public debt and, later, the debate over the impact of so much liquidity on the inflation levels observed in subsequent years.

== Impact on federal budget deficit and debt ==
Due to the COVID-19 pandemic, Congress and President Trump enacted the $2.2 trillion Coronavirus Aid, Relief, and Economic Security Act (CARES) on March 18, 2020. The Congressional Budget Office estimated that the budget deficit for fiscal year 2020 would increase to $3.3 trillion or 16% GDP, more than triple that of 2019 and the largest deficit since 1945 (measured as percentage of GDP). CBO also forecast the debt held by the public would rise to 98% GDP in 2020, compared with 79% in 2019 and 35% in 2007 before the Great Recession.

Under the current laws, CBO projects that debt will increase from 98% currently to 110% by 2032. Net interest rates will double from 1.6% to 3.2% by 2032.

Additional proposals for large stimulus packages in late 2020 were stalled. In December 2020, the Groundwork Collaborative think tank said a $3–4.5 trillion stimulus package would be needed to return the economy to pre-pandemic levels.

On July 1, 2021, the Congressional Budget Office said the federal deficit would reach $3 trillion for the second year in a row. The national debt of the United States as of January 2022 reached $30 trilion. Gross Domestic Product grew by between 5% and 6% in year 2021 and between 4% and 5% in the start of year 2022.

== Corporate bankruptcies ==
The following list is a selection of American companies that filed for bankruptcy during the pandemic.

Company	Sector	Date of filing	Notes
Guitar Center	Musical instruments	November 21, 2020	
Friendly's	Restaurant Chain	November 2, 2020	
CBL Properties	Shopping Mall Operator	November 1, 2020	
PREIT	Shopping Mall Operator	November 1, 2020	
Ruby Tuesday	Restaurants	October 7, 2020	
Sizzler	Restaurants	September 22, 2020	
Town Sports International Holdings	Sports Clubs	September 14, 2020	Owner of New York Sports Club, Boston Sports Clubs, Philadelphia Sports Clubs, Washington Sports Clubs, Lucille Roberts, TMPL Gym and Total Woman Gym and Spa.
Century 21	Retail	September 10, 2020	
Stein Mart	Retail	August 12, 2020	
Lord & Taylor	Retail	August 2, 2020	
Denbury Inc.	Energy	July 30, 2020	
California Pizza Kitchen	Restaurants	July 29, 2020	
Ascena Retail Group	Retail	July 23, 2020	Parent company of Ann Taylor and Loft, Justice, and Lane Bryant
Tailored Brands	Retail	July 23, 2020	Holding company for Men's Wearhouse, Jos. A. Bank, K&G Fashion Superstore, and Moores
Briggs & Stratton	Gasoline Engines	July 20, 2020	
Brooks Brothers	Retail	July 8, 2020	
Sur La Table	Retail	July 8, 2020	
Lucky Brand Jeans	Apparel	July 3, 2020	
Chesapeake Energy	Energy	June 28, 2020	
CEC Entertainment (parent company of Chuck E. Cheese)	Restaurants	June 25, 2020	
GNC Holdings Inc	Retail	June 23, 2020	
24 Hour Fitness	Fitness Centers	June 15, 2020	
Skillsoft	Software	June 15, 2020	
Tuesday Morning	Retail	May 27, 2020	
Advantage Rent a Car	Car rental	May 26, 2020	
The Hertz Corporation	Car rental	May 22, 2020	
Exide	Batteries	May 19, 2020	
J. C. Penney (operating as JCPenney)	Retail	May 15, 2020	
Intelsat	Communications	May 13, 2020	
Stage Stores	Retail	May 11, 2020	
Neiman Marcus	Retail	May 7, 2020	
Sweet Tomatoes (operating as Souplantation)	Restaurants	May 7, 2020	
Gold's Gym	Fitness Centers	May 4, 2020	
J.Crew	Retail	May 4, 2020	
Diamond Offshore Drilling	Energy	April 26, 2020	
Frontier Communications	Telecommunications	April 14, 2020	
True Religion	Retail	April 13, 2020	
XFL	American football league	April 13, 2020	
FoodFirst Global Restaurants (parent company of Bravo! Cucina Italiana and Brio Tuscan Grille)	Restaurants	April 11, 2020	
Dean & DeLuca	Grocery stores	April 1, 2020	
Whiting Petroleum Corporation	Energy	April 1, 2020	
Modell's Sporting Goods	Sporting goods	March 11, 2020	
Art Van Furniture	Retail	March 8, 2020	
Pier 1 Imports	Retail	February 17, 2020	Filing was before the pandemic, which resulted in company opting to liquidate.
