= Just in Case =

Just in Case may refer to:

== Music ==
- "Just in Case" (Ronnie Milsap song), 1975
- "Just in Case" (The Forester Sisters song), 1985; also recorded by Exile
- "Just in Case" (Morgan Wallen song), 2025
- "Just in Case", a song by Jaheim from Ghetto Love, 2001

== Other uses ==
- "Just in case" (catachresis), a phrase used by some philosophers to denote "if and only if"
- Just in Case (novel), a young adult novel by Meg Rosoff
- Just in case manufacturing, traditional manufacturing systems used before the influence of modern technologies
- Just in Case (Fear the Walking Dead), a television episode

== See also ==
- Justin Case (disambiguation)
- JIC (disambiguation)
