= CPFF =

Economic system created during the 2008 Financial crash

Commercial Paper Funding Facility (CPFF) was a system created by the United States Federal Reserve Board during the 2008 financial crisis to improve liquidity in the short-term funding markets. The CPFF was created on 27 October 2008 and funded a special purpose vehicle (SPV) that purchased three-month unsecured and asset-backed commercial paper (CP) from eligible issuers. This resulted in greater availability of credit for firms doing business. It worked under the aegis of the Federal Reserve Bank of New York where the NY Fed finances the purchase of highly rated unsecured and asset-backed commercial paper from eligible issuers via eligible primary dealers. The facility expired February 1, 2010. The final CP purchased matured on April 26, 2010. All CP notes purchased were repaid in full.

== Explanation ==
The CPFF began operations on October 27, 2008 following the collapse of Lehman Brothers and government bailout of AIG and the global credit freeze that ensued. The CPFF method of short-term funding provided liquidity to U.S. issuers of commercial paper through an SPV, which bought unsecured and asset-backed commercial paper for three-month period from eligible issuers with funds made available by the NY Fed. The commercial paper remained in the custody of the SPV until the CP matured. On maturity, the proceeds from commercial paper and other assets were used to repay the loan that was originally taken from the NY Fed. All purchases of the Commercial Papers by the SPV was done through the New York Fed’s primary dealers. This program lent out a total $738 billion before it was closed. 45 out 81 of the companies participating in this program were foreign firms. Research shows that Troubled Asset Relief Program (TARP) recipients were twice as likely to participate in the program than other commercial paper issuers who did not take advantage of the TARP bailout. The Fed incurred no losses from the CPFF.

This program was created at the same time that the Federal Deposit Insurance Corporation implemented the Temporary Liquidity Guarantee Program to increase liquidity in inter-bank lending.

== Eligibility ==
Only "Active" U.S. issuers of commercial paper (including those with a foreign parent), were eligible to sell commercial paper to the SPV. Active was defined as having at least three consecutive months of commercial paper outstanding during the period starting January 1, 2008 through August 31, 2008.

The commercial paper had to be rated at least A-1/P-1/F1 by a major nationally recognized statistical rating organization (NRSRO) and, if rated by multiple major NRSROs, must have been rated at least A-1/P-1/F1 by two or more major NRSROs.

As part of the application process to be eligible for this program issuers had to pay a 10 basis point (0.1%) fee based on their maximum CP balance during the active period mentioned above.

== See also ==
- Primary Dealer Credit Facility
