= Term Auction Facility =

Temporary Program

The Term Auction Facility (TAF) was a temporary program managed by the United States Federal Reserve designed to "address elevated pressures in short-term funding markets." Under the program the Fed auctions collateralized loans with terms of 28 and 84 days to depository institutions that are "in generally sound financial condition" and "are expected to remain so over the terms of TAF loans." Eligible collateral is the same as that accepted for discount window loans and includes a wide range of financial assets. The program was instituted in December 2007 in response to problems associated with the subprime mortgage crisis and was motivated by a desire to address a widening spread between interest rates on overnight and term (longer than overnight) interbank lending, indicating a retreat from risk-taking by banks. The action was in coordination with simultaneous and similar initiatives undertaken by the Bank of Canada, the Bank of England, the European Central Bank and the Swiss National Bank.

== Credit crunch ==
Early in August 2007, the subprime crisis began to spread to sectors outside mortgage and real-estate finance. The ECB began distributing funds through a discount window or fine-tuning operation. By August 9, the ECB lent €95 billion ($112 billion in the days conversion) to EU banks, and the Fed distributed $12 billion through repo operations. The Term Auction Facility formed a significant part of such global efforts, and empirical results indicate that it had a strong effect in reducing financial strains in the inter-bank money market, primarily through relieving financial institutions' liquidity concerns.

== Creation of facility ==
On December 11, 2007, the Fed lowered its discount rate to 4.75%, but due to the lack of borrowing from the discount window in the previous weeks, and a lack of liquidity after the 2007 credit crunch, the Federal Reserve and several other central banks opened their short term lending windows, hoping to alleviate the strain on interbank lending markets. In the federal funds market the Fed, along with the Bank of Canada, Bank of England, the European Central Bank and the Swiss National Bank, decided to implement a new monetary instrument the following day. This program, known in the US as the Term Auction Facility, enables the Fed to auction a set amount of funds to depository institutions, against a wide range of collateral. Auctions held on December 17 and December 20 released $20 billion each in the form of 28- and 35-day loans, respectively. On the December 17th Auction, bids began at 4.17% and ended with a rate of 4.65%, substantially below the discount rate. The Fed received over $63 billion in bids and released the full $20 billion to 93 different institutions.

As part of an effort to increase dollar liquidity around the world, the Fed coordinated with other central banks to lend simultaneously to depository institutions outside of its jurisdiction, which it cannot lend to directly. On December 11, the ECB held a simultaneous auction, in dollars, and awarded $10 billion at the rate determined by the Fed's auction. To facilitate the provision of U.S.-dollar liquidity by these other central banks, the Fed arranged currency swap lines with the ECB and the SNB in amounts of $20 billion and $4 billion, respectively.

One might question why such a facility is needed in the presence of a discount window where financial institutions can freely borrow directly from the Fed with the same terms as the Term Auction facility. It is argued that banks were reluctant to borrow from the discount window during the financial crisis as that might signal a potential weakness in the financial position of the borrowing bank. Hence, the need for a new monetary policy tool emerged and TAF provided just what they needed to banks.

The Fed used the TAF as a trial of this type of monetary tool, later adding additional facilities such as the Term Securities Lending Facility when it had proved its success and usefulness. The final Term Auction Facility auction was conducted on March 8, 2010.

== Extent of lending ==
The maximum balance of outstanding loans peaked at $483 billion in March 2009, while profits to the Fed on the facility passed $700 million in that year. Converting loans of varying length to a standard 28-days, a total of $6.18 trillion was loaned through TAF, making it one of the most significant of the Fed’s stabilization efforts.

== See also ==
- Lender of last resort
