= JIC =

JIC may refer to:

- Japan Investment Corporation, Japanese sovereign wealth fund
- IATA code for Jinchang Jinchuan Airport, China
- John Innes Centre, centre for research and training in plant science located in Norwich, England
- Joint Intelligence Center
- Joint Industrial Council, British labour-management group for an industrial sector
- Joint Information Center - see Incident Command System#Facilities
- Jordan Insurance Company, an insurance company in Jordan
- Jubail Industrial College, Saudi Arabia
- Jubilee International Church, a Pentecostal church in London, UK
- Just in case manufacturing
- "just in case" in internet slang (also "JiC")
- Juventud de Izquierda Comunista (Communist Left Youth), youth branch of the Organization of Communist Left in Spain
- Joint Intelligence Committee (United Kingdom), a Cabinet-level group which oversees British intelligence operations
- JIC fitting, Joint Industry Council standard for screw-together ends for machinery tubing
