= Primary dealer =

Purchaser of government securities directly from the government

A primary dealer is a firm that buys government securities directly from a government, with the intention of reselling them to others, thus acting as a market maker of government securities. The government may regulate the behaviour and number of its primary dealers and impose conditions of entry. Some governments sell their securities only to primary dealers; some sell them to others as well. Governments that use primary dealers include Australia, Belgium, Brazil, Canada, China, France, Hong Kong, India, Ireland, Hungary, Italy, Japan, Pakistan, Singapore, Spain, Sweden, the United Kingdom, and the United States.

== Primary dealers by country ==
=== Canada ===
As of 20 January, 2025, the Bank of Canada identifies the following primary dealers:

==== Treasury bills ====
- Bank of Montreal
- Canadian Imperial Bank of Commerce
- Desjardins Securities Inc.
- Laurentian Bank Securities Inc.
- National Bank Financial Inc.
- RBC Dominion Securities Inc.
- Scotia Capital Inc.
- The Toronto-Dominion Bank

==== Bonds ====
- BMO Nesbitt Burns Inc.
- Casgrain & Company Limited
- CIBC World Markets Inc.
- Desjardins Securities Inc.
- Merrill Lynch Canada Inc.
- Laurentian Bank Securities Inc.
- National Bank Financial Inc.
- RBC Dominion Securities Inc.
- Scotia Capital Inc.
- The Toronto-Dominion Bank

=== European Union ===
As of 1 August 2023, the European Commission of the European Union identifies the following 37 primary dealers:

- Banco Bilbao Vizcaya Argentaria S.A.
- Banco Santander S.A.
- Barclays Bank Ireland Plc
- BNP Paribas S.A.
- BofA Securities Europe S.A.
- Bred Banque Populaire
- CaixaBank S.A.
- Cecabank S.A.
- Citigroup Global Markets Europe AG
- Commerzbank AG
- Credit Agricole Corporate and Investment Bank S.A.
- Danske Bank A/S
- Deutsche Bank AG
- DZ Bank AG Deutsche Zentral-Genossenschaftsbank
- Erste Group Bank AG
- Eurobank S.A.
- Goldman Sachs Bank Europe SE
- HSBC Continental Europe S.A.
- Intesa Sanpaolo S.p.A.
- J.P. Morgan SE
- KBC Bank N.V.
- Landesbank Baden-Württemberg
- Morgan Stanley Europe SE
- MPS Capital Services Banca per le Imprese S.p.A.
- National Bank of Greece S.A.
- Natixis S.A.
- Natwest Markets N.V.
- Nomura Financial Products Europe GmbH
- Nordea Bank Abp
- Piraeus Bank S.A.
- Raiffeisen Bank International AG
- Royal Bank of Canada Capital Markets (Europe) GmbH
- Skandinaviska Enskilda Banken AB (SEB)
- Societe Generale S.A.
- Swedbank AB
- TD Global Finance Unlimited Company
- UniCredit Bank AG

=== Hong Kong ===
As of 1 October 2021, Hong Kong identifies the following 10 primary dealers, with two-year terms, ending 30 September 2023:

- Bank of China (Hong Kong) Limited
- Bank of Communications Company, Limited
- BNP Paribas, Hong Kong
- Citibank N.A.
- Credit Agricole Corporate and Investment Bank
- DBS Bank (Hong Kong) Limited
- Hang Seng Bank Limited
- The Hongkong and Shanghai Banking Corporation Limited
- Societe Generale
- Standard Chartered Bank (Hong Kong) Limited

=== Ireland ===
As of April 2021, the National Treasury Management Agency of Ireland identifies the following 14 primary dealers

- Barclays Bank Ireland
- BNP Paribas Paris
- BofA Securities Europe
- Cantor Fitzgerald Ireland
- Citigroup Global Markets Europe
- Danske Bank Copenhagen
- Deutsche Bank Frankfurt
- Goldman Sachs Bank Europe
- Goodbody Stockbrokers
- HSBC France
- JP Morgan Frankfurt
- Morgan Stanley Europe
- Natwest Markets N.V.
- Nomura Financial Products Europe GmbH

=== United States ===
In the United States, a primary dealer is a bank or securities broker-dealer that is permitted to trade directly with the Federal Reserve System ("the Fed"). Such firms are required to make bids or offers when the Fed conducts open market operations, provide information to the Fed's open market trading desk, and to participate actively in U.S. Treasury securities auctions. They consult with both the U.S. Treasury and the Fed about funding the budget deficit and implementing monetary policy. Many former employees of primary dealers work at the Treasury because of their expertise in the government debt markets, though the Fed avoids a similar revolving door policy.

The current system of primary dealers was set up in 1960 with 18 dealers. The number of primary dealers grew to 46 in 1988, declined to 21 by 2007, increased to 24 by July 2019, then to 25 in April 2022.

The relationship between the Fed and the primary dealers is governed by the Primary Dealers Act of 1988 and the Fed's operating policy "Administration of Relationships with Primary Dealers." Primary dealers purchase the vast majority of the U.S. Treasury securities (T-bills, T-notes, and T-bonds) sold at auction, and resell them to the public. Their activities extend well beyond the Treasury market. For example, according to the Wall Street Journal Europe (2/9/06 p. 20), all of the top ten dealers in the foreign exchange market are also primary dealers, and between them account for almost 73% of foreign exchange trading volume. Arguably, this group's members are the most influential and powerful non-governmental institutions in global financial markets. Group membership changes slowly, with the current list available from the New York Fed.

The primary dealers form a worldwide network that distributes new U.S. government debt. For example, Daiwa Securities and Mizuho Securities distribute the debt to Japanese buyers. BNP Paribas, Barclays, Deutsche Bank and NatWest Group distribute the debt to European buyers. Goldman Sachs, and Citigroup account for many American buyers. Nevertheless, most of these firms compete internationally and in all major financial centers.

In response to the subprime mortgage crisis and to the collapse of Bear Stearns, on March 19, 2008, the Federal Reserve set up the Primary Dealers Credit Facility (PDCF), whereby primary dealers could borrow at the Fed's discount window using several forms of collateral including mortgage-backed loans. The PDCF was closed on February 1, 2010.

==== Primary dealers with the Federal Reserve Bank of New York ====
As of June 30, 2022, the New York Fed identifies the following 24 primary dealers:

- ASL Capital Markets Inc.
- Bank of Montreal, Chicago Branch
- Bank of Nova Scotia, New York Agency
- BNP Paribas Securities Corp.
- Barclays Capital Inc.
- BofA Securities
- Cantor Fitzgerald & Co.
- Citigroup Global Markets Inc.
- Daiwa Capital Markets America Inc.
- Deutsche Bank Securities Inc.
- Goldman Sachs & Co. LLC
- HSBC Securities (USA) Inc.
- Jefferies LLC
- J.P. Morgan Securities LLC
- Mizuho Securities USA LLC
- Morgan Stanley & Co. LLC
- NatWest Markets Securities Inc.
- Nomura Securities International, Inc.
- RBC Capital Markets, LLC (Royal Bank of Canada)
- Santander US Capital Markets LLC
- Societe Generale, New York Branch
- TD Securities (USA) LLC
- UBS Securities LLC.
- Wells Fargo Securities LLC
