= Discount policy =

Discount policy is a policy tool used by central banks to control the money in circulation by raising or lowering interest rates.

If the Central Bank raises bank rates, the aim is to reduce money supply in the economy. With the high rates, people are expected to not take out loans and save their money in bank. Therefore, the amount of money in circulation will be reduced. If the discount policy of the central bank is used to raise bank rates it is trying to reduce inflation.

Meanwhile, if the central bank lowers bank rates, it aims to increase the amount of money supply. With the low rates, people are not expected to save their money in bank. Thus, the amount of money circulating in the society will increase. The decline in bank rates made by the Central Bank if the economy goes into a recession or if the economy is run into deflation.

== The United States discount rate policy ==
The United States Federal Reserve Seal of The United States government

The United States Federal Reserve System lends money to eligible commercial institution called discount window, Purposely created in 1913 as a mean to operate the central bank in The United States. The interest on loans given out to commercial institutions are discount rate, which is a monetary policy tool used by the Federal Reserve to stimulate the U.S economy. Commercial banks mark up interest from the loans taken from the discount window to gain profit from interest on loan taken out by the public. With the high interest rates, people are less expected to take out loans. Thus, there are less money circulating in the economy, causing it to move into a recessionary state. Decline in interest rates are made by the Central Bank if the economy goes into a recession. The Federal Reserve have varieties of tools along with the discount rate to manage and relieve tension in the economy.

=== Usage of the discount rate during the Great Recession ===
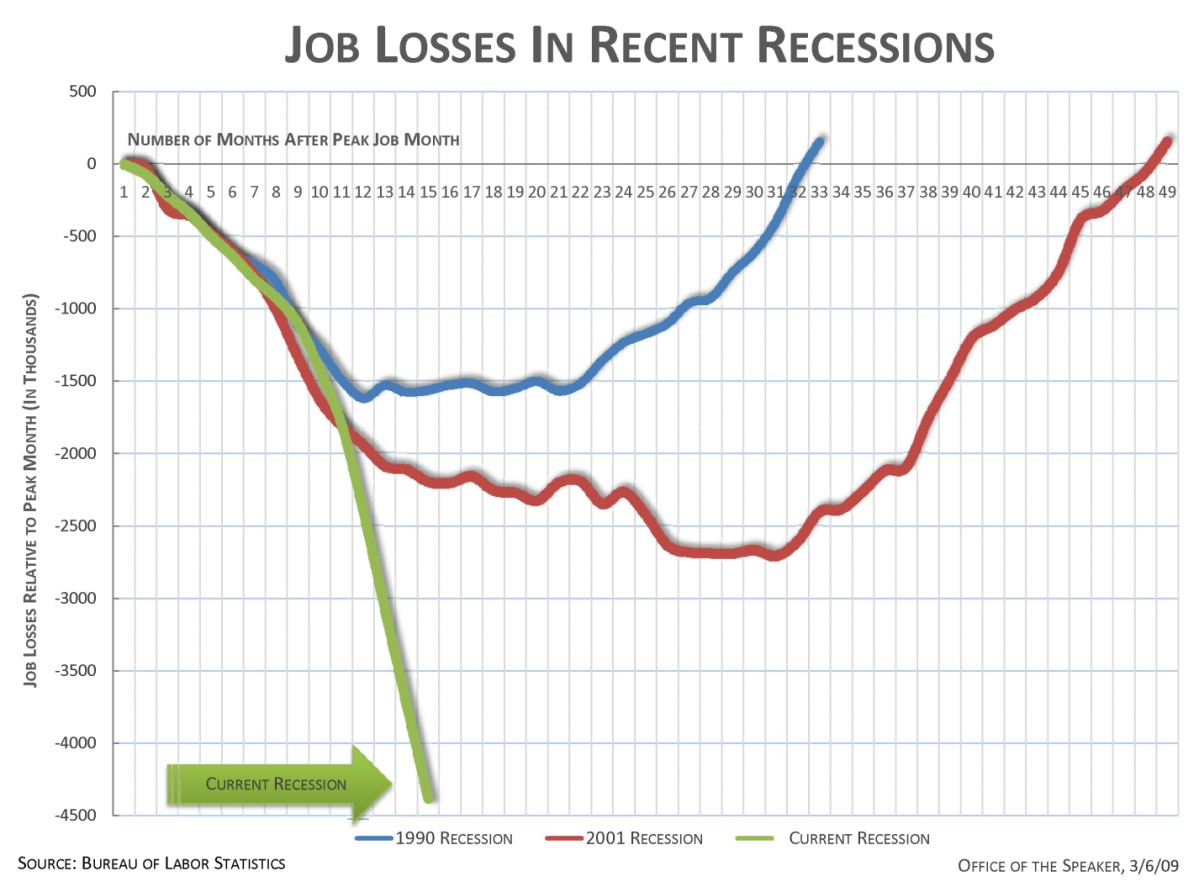
Statistical graph of 4.4 million jobs lost over 14 months in 2009 by Nancy Pelosi

According to UC Berkeley researchers, commercial institutions started to give loan to subprime borrowers in order to increase profits on risky investments. Since they were more likely to default on their loans, banks were losing money which resulted in increase interest rates. Consequently, interest rate prices are higher than usual, people weren't taking out loans causing the economy to be contractionary. In turn, the Federal Reserve System recognized the problem and took counter measures to intervene with the downsizing economy. They decreased the interest rates at the discount window to bail out the economy during the Great Recession. Since the commercial banks are able to retrieve loans at a lower rate, this waterfalls down to the general public to be able to circulate money in the economy. Monetary policy used by The Central Banks caused the economy to thrive from the recession by utilizing the discount rate that bails out commercial banks.

== See also ==
- Bank rate
- Chronic inflation
- Discount window
- Money supply
