= Term Securities Lending Facility =

- Seal

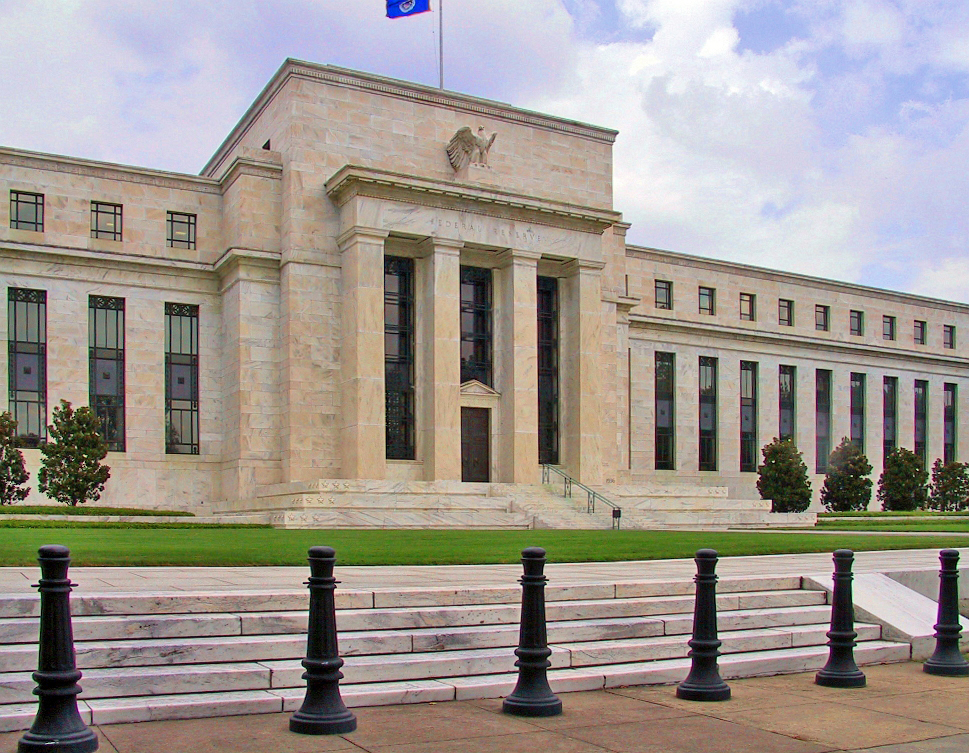
- The Federal Reserve System Eccles Building (Headquarters)
- Headquarters: Washington, D.C.
- Chairman: Jerome Powell
- Central bank of: United States
- Currency: U.S. dollar USD (ISO 4217)
- Bank rate: 2.25%
- Interest on reserves: 3.5%
- Website: federalreserve.gov

The Term Securities Lending Facility (TSLF) was a 28-day facility managed by the United States Federal Reserve offering Treasury general collateral (GC) (i.e., Treasury bills, notes, bonds and inflation-indexed securities) to the primary dealers in exchange for other program-eligible collateral. It was created to combat the liquidity crisis in American banks as a result of the subprime mortgage crisis and the 2008 financial crisis. The facility was open from March 2008 through January 2010.

This is different from the System Open Market Account (SOMA) Securities Lending program which offers specific Treasury securities held by SOMA for loan against Treasury GC on an overnight basis. Dealers bid competitively in a multiple-price auction held every day at noon. The TSLF offers Treasury GC held by SOMA for a 28-day term. Dealers bid competitively in single-price auctions held weekly and borrowers will pledge program-eligible collateral.

== History ==
TSLF was announced on 11 March 2008. By the end of the program it loaned out U.S. Treasury securities worth $2.3 trillion to just eighteen Wall Street banks. In 2008, as liquidity in the global markets came to a halt, the FED took action to allow the TSLF to expand the types of acceptable collateral: student loans, car loans, home equity loans and credit card debt, as long as it was highly rated. Ironically, many of the establishment rating firms were themselves shown to be of little worth in the preceding few years, and the ratings system was in the state of being reworked.

The collateral for the Term Securities Lending Facility (TSLF) also has been expanded; eligible collateral will now include all investment-grade debt securities. Previously, only Treasury securities, agency securities, and AAA-rated mortgage-backed and asset-backed securities could be pledged. This was one of many emergency lending programs of the Federal Reserve during the 2008 financial crisis.

The TSLF was intended to last until February 2010, but the Fed was willing to expand its duration if market conditions warranted it. They did not, and the TSLF was closed on February 1, 2010.
