= Justin Case =

Justin Case may refer to:

- Pen name of Hugh B. Cave (1910–2004), American writer
- Pen name of Rupert Gleadow (1909-1974), British lawyer and legal writer
- Justin Case, British actor and director
- Justin Case (film), 1988 television film
- Justincase, American band

== See also ==
- Just in Case (disambiguation)
