= Jubilee Church London =

Jubilee International Church
- Jubilee International Church
- 51.42873°N 0.02979°E
- Location: London
- Country: England

History
- Founded: 12 April 1992
- Dedicated: 8 July 2006

Architecture
- Years built: May 1935 (building)

Jubilee International Church London was a Pentecostal church in Grove Park, London SE12. The church was a member of Assemblies of God.

== History ==
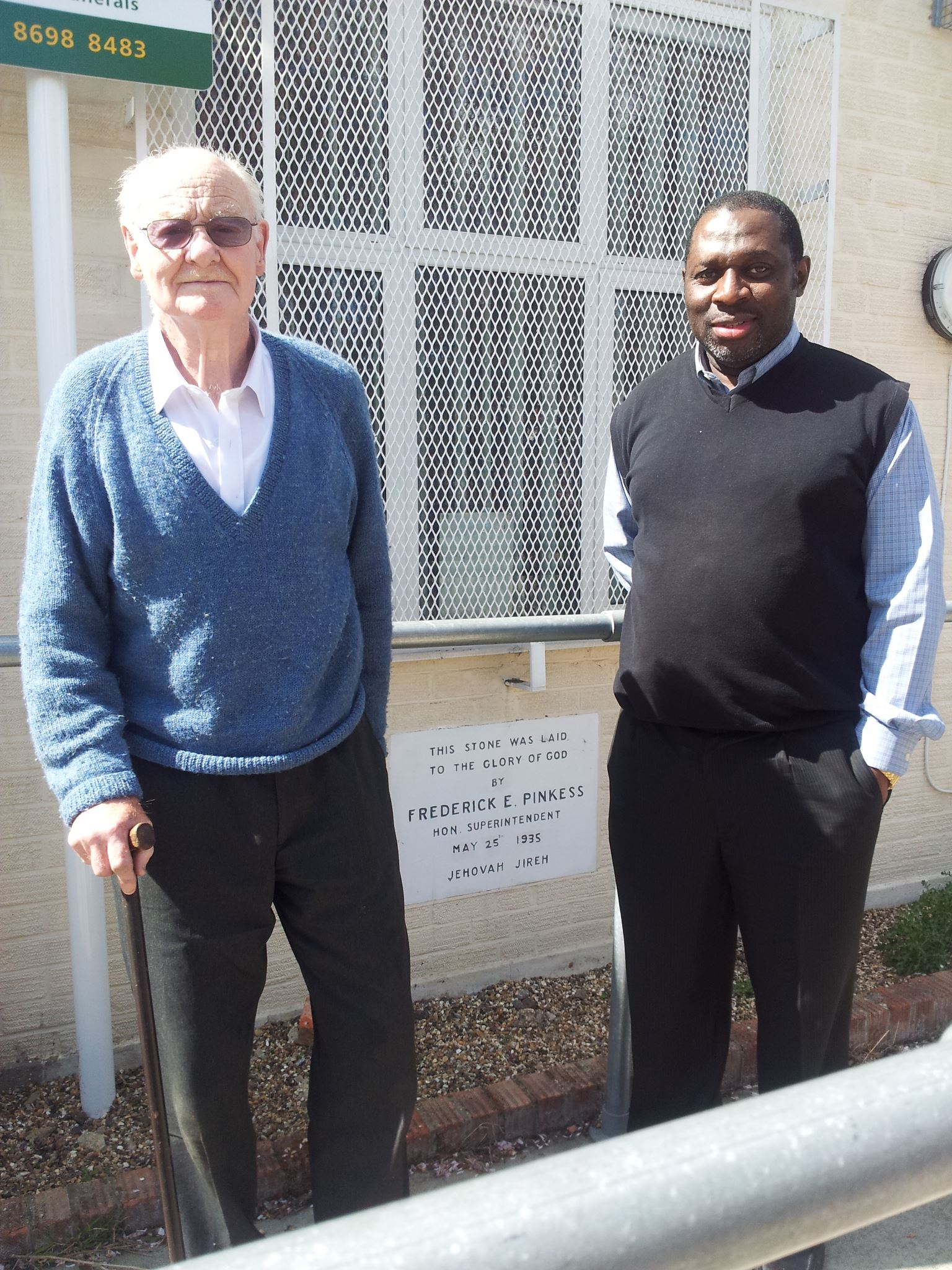
David Pinkess (Fred Pinkess' son), near the foundation stone of the church

When the Grove Park Estate was first built in the 1920s, Lewisham Council determined that it should also include a church. Mr Frederick E Pinkess who had been running a successful ‘mobile’ Sunday school in the community decided to apply for permission to get a church built. He could clearly see that the area had potential for a thriving parish. With the help of the Shaftesbury Society, which was affiliated to the Baptist Church, Mr Pinkess raised enough money to build a church which was completed in May 1935. It was a non-denominational place of worship called Grove Park Mission and served as a mercy ministry to the poor. In the 1930s and 1940s, the church had a very popular and effective outreach programme in the community especially amongst the children, which led to a thriving Sunday school. Outreaches included opening-air singing and playing hymns along the local residential streets while carrying around the heavy church organ for music. There were regular open air outreaches every Sunday afternoon and evening for many years.

In 1947, the work was connected with the Free Church movement which was of the Plymouth Brethren movement. Then from 1961, Pastor Gordon Thomson who was connected to Honor Oak Christian Fellowship became the long-term pastor of the congregation now called The Christian Fellowship. A local branch of Operation Mobilisation was also instrumental in helping with this work.

In 1987, Book Aid began to lease space in the building from The Christian Fellowship, and then in August 2005 the building was sold to Jubilee International Church who had migrated from the Clapham area. Pastor Thomson expressed the fact that they were thankful to see the church building in the hands of a new thriving congregation. He and his wife both died within a month of each other in 2007.

== Opposition ==
The new church came into the media spotlight in the summer of 2006 following serious controversy with local residents in Grove Park and heated dialogues with the local council, London Borough of Lewisham regarding planning consent. Following a favourable decision by the council regarding planning usage, this issue eventually culminated in racist arson attacks against the church and continuing minor attacks and opposition for almost two years. The proverbial dust settled after about 18 months.
