= Karen Shaw Petrou =

Financial policy analyst (1953–2026)

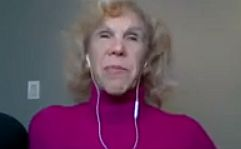
- Petrou at Horasis meeting in 2021
- Born: Karen Ann Dolmatch; March 6, 1953; New York City, U.S.
- Died: February 21, 2026 (aged 72); Washington, D.C., U.S.
- Education: Wellesley College, University of California at Berkeley
- Occupations: Financial analyst and consultant
- Notable work: Engine of Inequality: The Fed and the Future of Wealth in America
- Spouse(s): Robert Shaw (m. 1975, divorced) Basil Petrou (m. 1995; died 2021)

Karen Ann Shaw Petrou (née Dolmatch; March 6, 1953 – February 21, 2026) was an American financial analyst and co-founder of Federal Financial Analytics, where she provided analytic and advisory services on legislation, public policy, and regulatory issues that affect financial services in the United States and foreign countries.

== Life and career ==
Karen Ann Dolmatch was born in New York City on March 6, 1953, and grew up in Briarcliff Manor, New York. At age 18, she was diagnosed with retinitis pigmentosa – losing her reading vision in her mid-30s, and requiring a guide dog at age 50. On February 21, 2026, she died in Washington, D.C., at the age of 72, from cancer.

=== Education ===
Petrou received an undergraduate degree in political science from Wellesley College, studied at Massachusetts Institute of Technology, and earned an MA in political science from the University of California at Berkeley, where she was also a doctoral candidate.

=== Career ===
In 1977, Petrou began her career at Bank of America in San Francisco. By age 27, she had become vice president at Bank of America in Washington, D.C. In 1985, she co-founded her own company – Federal Financial Analytics – with her husband, Basil Petrou, to provide "analytical and advisory services on legislative, regulatory, and public-policy issues affecting financial services companies".

=== Notable accomplishments ===
- Petrou, Karen (2021). Engine of Inequality: The Fed and the Future of Wealth in America. John Wiley & Sons. p. 288. ISBN 978-1119726746.
- Petrou, Karen (April 23, 2019). "BioBonds: Unlocking Billions for Biomedical Treatment and Cure". socialinnovationsjournal.org.
- Innovator of BioBonds financial instrument. H.R. Bill 3437 (loans for Biomedical Research Act), was introduced on May 20, 2021, receiving bipartisan support in the US House of Representatives, but was impeded by the COVID pandemic and did not receive a vote.
- Authored multiple opinion articles in general interest, financial, and business publications – American Banker, Bloomberg News, Barron's, Financial Times, mint.
- C-SPAN – participant in eight financial-panel discussions broadcast between 2003 and 2023.
- NPR – multiple interviews as financial analyst, broadcast on National Public Radio between 2008 and 2019.
- Speeches and presentations before the US Congress; the European Central Bank; the International Monetary Fund; and the Federal Reserve Bank of New York, St. Louis, San Francisco, and Chicago.

=== Service ===
- Chair of the Board of Directors of Foundation Fighting Blindness.
- Advisory board member for the Morin Center for Banking and Financial Law, Boston University School of Law.

=== Death ===
Petrou died on February 21, 2026, at the age of 72.
