= Discount window =

Mechanism for central bank lending to eligible depository institutions

The discount window is an instrument of monetary policy (usually controlled by central banks) that allows eligible institutions to borrow money from the central bank, usually on a short-term basis, to meet temporary shortages of liquidity caused by internal or external disruptions.

The interest rate charged on such loans by a central bank is called the bank rate, discount rate, policy rate, base rate, or repo rate, and is separate and distinct from the prime rate. It is also not the same thing as the federal funds rate or its equivalents in other currencies, which determine the rate at which banks lend money to each other. In recent years, the discount rate has been approximately a percentage point above the federal funds rate (see Lombard credit). Because of this, it is a relatively unimportant factor in the control of the money supply and is only taken advantage of at large volume during emergencies.

== Etymology ==
The term originated with the practice of sending a bank representative to a reserve bank teller window when a bank needed to borrow money.

== In the United States ==
The Federal Reserve created the discount window to help banks avoid bank runs. Because the rate was below market, the Fed discouraged its use, causing a stigma against companies that did borrow from the window. In 2003 the Fed raised the rate to make using the window less appealing.

In the United States, there are several different rates charged to institutions borrowing at the discount window. In 2006, these were the primary credit rate (the most common), the secondary credit rate (for banks that are less financially sound), and the seasonal credit rate. The Federal Reserve does not publish information regarding institutions' eligibility for primary or secondary credit. Primary and secondary credit is normally offered on a secured overnight basis, while seasonal credit is extended up to nine months. The primary credit is normally set 100 basis points (bp) above the federal funds target and the secondary credit rate is set 50 bp above the primary rate. The seasonal credit rate is set from an averaging of the effective federal funds rate and 90-day certificate of deposit rates.

Institutions must provide acceptable collateral to secure the loan. Such includes Treasury securities, municipal bonds, and mortgage loans.

=== Use after September 11, 2001 ===
After the 11 September 2001 attacks, as the volume of borrowing requests increased dramatically, lending to banks through the discount window totaled about $46 billion, more than 200 times the daily average for the previous month. The flood of funds released into the banking system reduced the need for banks to rely on immediate payments from other banks so they could pay what they owed others. That kept liquidity in the banking system despite interruptions of communications and cash flow between banks.

=== Alterations during 2007–2009 credit crunch ===
On August 17, 2007, the Board of Governors of the Federal Reserve announced a temporary change to primary credit lending terms. The discount rate was cut by 50 bp—to 5.75% from 6.25%—and the term of loans was extended from overnight to up to thirty days. That reduced the spread of the primary credit rate over the federal funds rate from 100 basis points to 50 basis points.

On March 16, 2008, concurrent with measures to rescue Bear Stearns from insolvency and to stem further institutional bank runs, the Federal Reserve announced significant and temporary changes to primary credit lending terms. The maximum term of loans was extended from thirty days to ninety days. Less than a year before, the term had been only overnight. The primary credit rate was also reduced to 3.25% from 3.50%, which cut the spread of the primary credit rate over the federal funds rate to 25 basis points from 50 basis points.

Changes to rates, August 2007 - February 2010
Date	Discount rate (change)	Federal funds target rate/range (change)
Jan - July, 2007	6.25%	5.25%
August 17, 2007	5.75% (−50 bp)	5.25% (no change)
September 18, 2007	5.25% (−50 bp)	4.75% (−50 bp)
October 31, 2007	5.00% (−25 bp)	4.50% (−25 bp)
December 11, 2007	4.75% (−25 bp)	4.25% (−25 bp)
January 22, 2008	4.00% (−75 bp)	3.50% (−75 bp)
January 30, 2008	3.50% (−50 bp)	3.00% (−50 bp)
March 16, 2008	3.25% (−25 bp)	3.00% (no change)
March 18, 2008	2.50% (−75 bp)	2.25% (−75 bp)
April 30, 2008	2.25% (−25 bp)	2.00% (−25 bp)
October 8, 2008	1.75% (−50 bp)	1.50% (−50 bp)
October 29, 2008	1.25% (−50 bp)	1.00% (−50 bp)
December 16, 2008	0.50% (−75 bp)	0–0.25% (−75 bp)
January 16, 2009	0.50% (no change)	0-0.25% (no change)
February 18, 2010	0.75% (+25bp)	0−0.25% (no change)

The Wall Street Journal reported in November 2019 that banks were "desperate to avoid the stigma attached to accessing the window" and were "hoarding cash at levels well above what regulators require".

=== March 2023 United States bank failures ===
During the March 2023 United States bank failures, banks drew $153 billion from the discount window as of 15 March 2023, a new record. It was much more popular than the new Bank Term Funding Program, which distributed $12 billion.

== In the Eurozone ==
Usage of the deposit facility of the European Central Bank

In the Eurozone, the facility nearest to the discount window is called Standing Facilities. These are used to manage overnight liquidity. Qualifying counter-parties can use the ECB's Standing Facilities to increase the amount of cash they have available for overnight settlements using the Marginal Lending Facility. Conversely, eligible counterparties can use the deposit facility to place funds overnight with a national central bank in the Eurosystem.

Counter-parties must have collateral for the funds they receive from the Marginal Lending Facility and will be charged the overnight rate set by the ECBS. Excess capital can be deposited with the Deposit Facility and it will earn (or pay) interest at the rate offered by the ECBS. The rates for these two facilities signal the central bank system's outlook for commercial interest rates and set respectively ECB's upper and lower limit for interest rates in the overnight market.

== See also ==
- Bank rate
- Discount policy
- LIBOR-OIS spread
- Primary Dealer Credit Facility
- Shiftability theory
- TED spread
- ZIRP
