= Just-in-case manufacturing =

Earlier production term

Just-in-case manufacturing (JIC) is a term sometimes applied to traditional manufacturing systems used before the influence of modern technologies and newer transportation infrastructures. It is the contrary in many ways to the recently evolved Just In Time manufacturing system.

== Operation ==
In JIC, manufacturers need to maintain large inventories of supplies, parts, warehousing resources, and extra workers to meet production contingencies. These contingencies, more common in less industrialized countries, can be poor transportation infrastructure, poor quality control, vulnerability to other suppliers' production problems, and natural disasters. These supply-chain instabilities could lead to costly production inefficiencies therefore a manufacturer may maintain and pay for excess inventory and backups of "fragile" production stages which could get out of sync, cause production shutdowns, or create supply-chain delays for other manufacturers. In JIC, manufacturers reorder stock before it reaches the buffer level or minimum level to allow themselves to have inventories to be sold while the suppliers are supplying the goods. This time range from the time the firm reorders the stock to the time the supplier provides the new stock is known as lead time. Thus a JIC inventory system tries to keep a minimum level of inventories just in case of emergencies, hence the name "Just In Case".

One major reason for practicing a more costly JIC system are the potential losses paid (i.e. permanent loss of major customers, loss of suppliers, supply-chain collapse) if supply-chain shocks occur on several occasions. If the JIT response contingencies are too slow or fail to keep production flowing additional costs may be incurred. Under these circumstances the additional costs due to maintaining extra storage, resources, and system resiliency may potentially be more cost effective than using a more efficient JIT system. A JIC examples of buyers would be the military or hospitals who need to maintain large inventories because waiting for JIT producers to ramp up production for needed supplies may result in losses (i.e. wars, lives).
