= Primary Dealer Credit Facility =

2008–2010 Federal Reserve lending facility

On March 17, 2008, in response to the subprime mortgage crisis and the collapse of Bear Stearns, the Federal Reserve announced the creation of a new lending facility, the Primary Dealer Credit Facility (PDCF). Eligible borrowers include all financial institutions listed as primary dealers, and the term of the loan is a repurchase agreement, or "repo" loan, whereby the broker dealer sells a security in exchange for funds through the Fed's discount window. The security in question acts as collateral, and the Federal Reserve charges an interest rate equivalent to the Fed's primary credit rate. The facility was intended to improve the ability of broker dealers to access liquidity in the overnight loan market that banks use to meet their reserve requirements.

The creation of the Primary Dealer Credit Facility constitutes the first time in the history of the Federal Reserve that the Fed has lent directly to investment banks, and it reflects the severity of the 2008 financial crisis perceived by Federal Reserve Chairman Ben Bernanke. Non-bank institutions such as investment banks exist outside the Fed's regulatory structure. A full detail of the nominal value of loans outstanding through the PDCF is available in the Federal Reserve's public balance sheet.

During the first three days the facility was open, an average of $13.3 billion was borrowed daily with $28.8 billion in loans outstanding. Lending activity peaked in the first week of October 2008, averaging around $150 billion daily. The facility closed on February 1, 2010. According to the Federal Reserve, all loans extended under this facility were repaid in full, with interest, in accordance with the terms of the facility. In total, $8.95 trillion in loans were made through the Facility.

== Changes to the Facility ==
On July 30, 2008, the Federal Reserve announced several actions to further increase liquidity, including an extension of the Primary Dealer Credit Facility, through January 30, 2009. On September 14, 2008, in the wake of the collapse of Lehman Brothers, the Federal Reserve announced plans to expand the collateral eligible at the PDCF to include all collateral eligible in tri-party repurchase agreements with the major clearing banks. Originally, only investment-grade debt securities were accepted as collateral through the PDCF. On December 2, 2008, the Federal Reserve announced a further extension of the PDCF through April 30, 2009.

On March 17, 2020, the Federal Reserve reopened the PDCF in order to limit the economic impact caused by the COVID-19 pandemic.

== Criticisms ==
The actions of the Federal Reserve, including the creation of the Primary Dealer Credit Facility, have expanded its balance sheet from $800 billion, consisting mainly of safe treasury bills, to over $2 trillion, consisting largely of riskier debt and mortgage-backed securities. The decision to expand the eligible collateral was criticized for further weakening the Fed's balance sheet. Also, the Fed's actions have been criticized as a power grab to become more powerful relative to other financial regulators such as the SEC and the FDIC.

Many have criticized the PDCF for lending to investment banks on the same terms as more tightly regulated financial institutions. They argue that since the Federal Reserve is now lending directly to investment banks that these institutions, along with other private-equity firms and hedge funds, should face broader regulation.

In a hearing of the United States House Committee on Financial Services on January 13, 2009, Rep. Alan Grayson (D-Fl) pressed Federal Reserve Vice Chairman Donald Kohn about releasing the details of exactly which firms have received funds from the Federal Reserve and specifically how much. The volume of lending at the PDCF was only published in the aggregate, shielding the identity of exactly which institutions used the facility and how much they borrowed. Data disclosing details of the loans is available on the Fed Board of Governors' site.

== See also ==
- Commercial Paper Funding Facility
