= Economy of the United Kingdom =

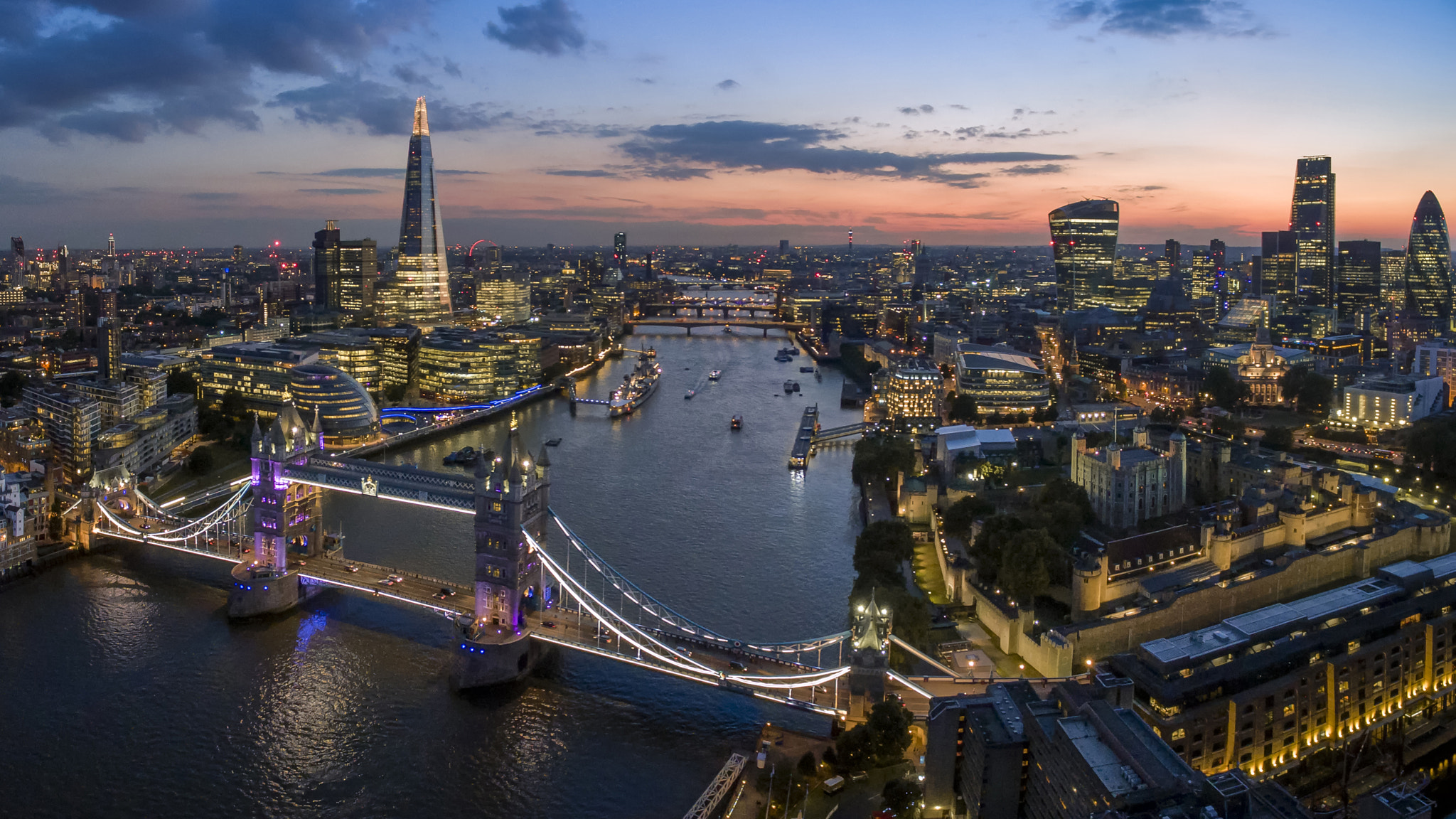
- London's central business district, concentrated in the City of London (pictured right) and Canary Wharf, is one of the main global financial centres.
- Currency: Pound sterling (GBP, £)
- Fiscal year: 1 April to 31 March (Note: 6 – 5 April for personal tax)
- Trade organisations: WTO, G-20, G7, CPTPP and OECD
- Country group: Advanced economy; High-income economy; Welfare state

Statistics
- Population: ▲69,483,939 (2025)
- GDP: ▲$4.27 trillion (nominal; 2026); ▲$4.78 trillion (PPP; 2026)
- GDP rank: 5th (nominal; 2026); 9th (PPP; 2026)
- GDP growth: ▲1.1% (2024); ▲1.2% (2025); ▲1.3% (2026f)
- GDP per capita: ▲$61,108 (nominal; 2026); ▲$68,478 (PPP; 2026)
- GDP per capita rank: 19th (nominal; 2026); 29th (PPP; 2026)
- GDP per capita growth: 1.1% (2025)
- GDP by sector: Services: 80%; Manufacturing: 9.1%; Construction: 6.2%; Utilities: 2.6%; Mining and extractives: 1.3%; Agriculture: 0.6%; (2024)
- Inflation (CPI): ▼2.8% (April 2026)
- Base borrowing rate: ▼3.75% (Dec 2025)
- Population below national poverty line: ▲21% (2023) (Note: Relative low income after housing costs)
- Gini coefficient: ▲36.5 (2022)
- Human Development Index: ▲0.946 HDI (2023) (13th); ▲0.869 IHDI (2023); (13th)
- Corruption Perceptions Index: 71 out of 100 points (2024) (20th)
- Labour force: 33,496,000 / 75.1% in employment (Jan–Mar 2026) (Note: In employment and aged 16 or over (quantity) or aged 16–64 (per cent))
- Labour force by occupation: List: 26.9% Professional; 14.9% Associate professional; 11.4% Managers, directors and senior officials; 9.2% Administrative and secretarial; 9.0% Elementary occupations; 8.7% Caring, leisure and other service; 8.3% Skilled trades; 5.7% Sales and customer service; 5.5% Process plant and machine operatives; (Jan–Dec 2025) (Note: Per cent is a proportion of all persons in employment aged 16 and over)
- Unemployment: ▲1,806,000 / 5% (Jan–Mar 2026) (Note: Unemployed aged 16 and over. Per cent is a proportion of economically active.)
- Youth unemployment: ▲16.2% (Jan–Mar 2026)
- Average gross salary: £3,020 per month (2026 April)
- Average net salary: £2,364 per month (2026 April)
- Median income: £766.60 weekly (2025) (Note: Median gross weekly pay for full time employees resident in the UK)
- Wage growth: 1.1% (median, 2025)
- Main industries: List: Machine tools; electric power equipment; automation equipment; railway equipment; shipbuilding; aircraft; motor vehicles and parts; electronics and communications equipment; metals; chemicals; coal; petroleum; paper and paper products; food processing; textiles; clothing; other consumer goods

External
- Exports: ▲£931.7 billion (2025) (Note: Goods and services) (4th)
- Export goods: List: £31.3bn Cars; £29.9bn Power generators; £25.0bn Medicinal and pharmaceutical products; £13.2bn Crude oil; £12.8bn Aircraft; £12.0bn Beverages and tobacco; £11.6bn Scientific instruments; £364.3bn Total (2024) (Note: Excluding services)
- Main export partners: European Union 41.4%; United States 21.8%; China 3.4%; Switzerland 2.9%; India 2.1%; Canada 2.1%; (2025)
- Imports: ▲£971.7 billion (2025) (6th)
- Import goods: List: £38.4bn Cars; £27.2bn Medicinal and pharmaceutical products; £27.0bn Refined oil; £25.1bn Crude oil; £23.1bn Power generators; £20.0bn Miscellaneous electrical goods; £16.1bn Telecoms and sound equipment; £14.9bn Vegetables and fruit; £14.6bn Clothing; £14.5bn Other manufactures (consumer); £568.6bn Total (2024)
- Main import partners: European Union 49.0%; United States 13.3%; China 7.6%; India 3.0%; Norway 2.8%; Switzerland 2.7%; (2025)
- FDI stock: Inward: £2.127 trillion; Outward: £1.856 trillion; (2024)
- Current account: £−53.3 billion (2023)
- Gross external debt: £7.533 trillion (2023) (2nd)
- Net international investment position: £−658.2 billion (2023)

Public finance
- Government debt: £2.917 trillion / 94.2% of GDP (net) (2025/26) (Note: Public sector net debt excluding public sector banks)
- Foreign reserves: List: Gross reserves (Jan 2025): UK Government: $186.4 billion; Bank of England: $32.1 billion; Net reserves (Jan 2025): UK Government: $94.2 billion; Bank of England: $0.021 billion
- Budget balance: £−129 billion / 4.2% of GDP (2025/26)
- Revenue: £1.232 trillion (2025/26)
- Spending: £1.362 trillion (2025/26)
- Economic aid: $19.1 billion (2023) (Note: Official development assistance, donor)
- Credit rating: List: S&P Global Ratings: AA (Domestic); AA (Foreign); AAA (T&C Assessment); Outlook: Stable; 20 October 2023; Moody's: Aa3; Outlook: Stable; 20 October 2023; Fitch Ratings: AA-; Outlook: Stable; 22 March 2024

The United Kingdom has a highly developed social market economy. In 2026, the United Kingdom is the fifth-largest national economy in the world measured by nominal gross domestic product (GDP), ninth-largest by purchasing power parity (PPP), and about 21st by nominal GDP per capita, constituting 3.33% of world GDP and 2.13% by purchasing power parity (PPP).

The United Kingdom has one of the most globalised economies and comprises England, Scotland, Wales and Northern Ireland. In 2022, the United Kingdom was the fifth-largest exporter of goods and services in the world and the fourth-largest importer. It also had the fourth-largest outward foreign direct investment, and the fifteenth-largest inward foreign direct investment. In 2022, the United Kingdom's trade with the European Union accounted for 42% of the country's exports and 48% of its total imports. The United Kingdom has a highly efficient and strong social security system, which comprises roughly 24.5% of GDP.

The service sector dominates, contributing 82% of GDP; the financial services industry is particularly important, and London is the second-largest financial centre in the world. Edinburgh was ranked 17th in the world, and 6th in Europe for its financial services industry in 2021. The United Kingdom's technology sector has an enterprise value of US$1.2 trillion, with fintech, health technology, and semiconductors accounting for 48% of the value. The aerospace industry in the United Kingdom is the second-largest national aerospace industry. Its pharmaceutical industry plays an important role in the economy. Of the world's 500 largest companies, 20 are headquartered in the UK, with combined global revenues of US$1.45 trillion. The economy is boosted by North Sea oil and gas production; its proven reserves were estimated at 2.9 billion barrels in 2024, although it has been a net importer of oil since 2005. There are significant regional variations in prosperity, with South East England and North East Scotland being the richest areas per capita. The size of London's economy makes it the biggest city by GDP in Europe. In 2022, the UK spent around 2.8% of GDP on research and development.

In the 18th century, Britain was the first nation to industrialise. During the 19th century, through its expansive colonial empire and technological superiority, Britain had a preeminent role in the global economy, accounting for 9.1% of the world's GDP in 1870. The Second Industrial Revolution was also taking place rapidly in the United States and the German Empire; this presented an increasing economic challenge for the UK, leading into the 20th century. The cost of fighting both the First and Second World Wars further weakened the UK's relative position. During the Great Recession of 2008, the UK economy suffered a significant decline, followed by a period of weak growth and stagnation. Slow growth continued following UK's exit from the EU in 2020, which damaged longer-term growth.

Government involvement is primarily exercised by His Majesty's Treasury, headed by the Chancellor of the Exchequer, and the Department for Business and Trade. Since 1979, management of the economy has followed a broadly laissez-faire approach. The Bank of England is the UK's central bank, and since 1997 its Monetary Policy Committee has been responsible for setting interest rates, quantitative easing, and forward guidance.

== History ==
=== 1945 to 1979 ===
The Second World War net loss to UK national wealth amounted to 18.6% (£4.59 billion) of the nation's pre-war wealth (£24.68 billion) at 1938 prices. After the war, a new Labour government fully nationalised the Bank of England, civil aviation, telephone networks, railways, gas, electricity, and the coal, iron and steel industries, affecting 2.3 million workers. Post-war, the United Kingdom enjoyed a long period without a major recession; there was a rapid growth in prosperity in the 1950s and 1960s, with unemployment staying low and not exceeding 3.5% until the early 1970s. The annual rate of growth between 1960 and 1973 averaged 2.9% although this figure was far behind France, West Germany and Italy.

Gradual deindustrialisation meant the closure of operations in mining, heavy industry, and manufacturing, resulting in the loss of highly paid working-class jobs. The UK's share of global manufacturing output had risen from 9.5% in 1830, during the Industrial Revolution, to 22.9% in the 1870s. It fell to 13.6% by 1913, 10.7% by 1938, and 4.9% by 1973. Overseas competition, lack of innovation, trade unionism, the welfare state, loss of the British Empire, and cultural attitudes have all been put forward as explanations. It reached crisis point in the 1970s against the backdrop of a worldwide energy crisis, high inflation, and a dramatic influx of low-cost manufactured goods from Asia.

From 1971 to 1973 a floating exchange rate regime de facto replaced the post-war Bretton Woods system of fixed exchange rates for many global currencies, including sterling. The relatively stable US-controlled system that had been agreed upon in 1944 was no longer considered advantageous to the United States. During the 1973 oil crisis, which saw oil prices quadruple, the 1973–1974 stock market crash, and the secondary banking crisis of 1973–1975, the British economy fell into the 1973–1975 recession, and the Conservative government was ousted by the Labour Party, which had previously governed from 1964 to 1970. The UK recorded weaker growth than many other European nations in the 1970s: even after the recession, the economy was blighted by rising unemployment and double-digit inflation, which exceeded 20% more than once and rarely fell below 10% after 1973.

During the 1976 sterling crisis, the UK was forced to apply for a loan of £2.3 billion (equivalent to £15.5 billion in 2025) from the International Monetary Fund. Denis Healey, the then Chancellor of the Exchequer, was required to implement public spending cuts and other economic reforms in order to secure the loan, and for a while the British economy improved, with growth of 4.3% in early 1979. After the discovery of large North Sea oil reserves, the UK became a net exporter of oil by the end of the 1970s, which contributed to a massive appreciation of the pound, making exports in general more expensive and imports cheaper. Oil prices doubled between 1979 and 1980, further reducing manufacturing profitability.

Following the Winter of Discontent, when the UK experienced numerous public sector strikes, the government of James Callaghan lost a vote of no confidence in March 1979. This triggered the general election on 3 May 1979, which resulted in Margaret Thatcher's Conservative Party forming a new government. In retrospect, the 1970s are considered to have been a "lost decade" for the British economy.

=== 1979 to 1997 ===
A new period of neo-liberal economics began with this election. During the 1980s, many state-owned industries and utilities were privatised, taxes cut, trade union reforms passed and markets deregulated. GDP fell by 5.9% initially, but growth subsequently returned and rose to an annual rate of 5% at its peak in 1988, one of the highest rates of any country in Europe.

Thatcher's modernisation of the economy was far from trouble-free; her battle with inflation, which in 1980 had risen to 21.9%, resulted in a substantial increase in unemployment from 5.3% in 1979 to over 10.4% by the start of 1982, peaking at nearly 11.9% in 1984 – a level not seen in Britain since the Great Depression. The rise in unemployment coincided with the early 1980s global recession, after which UK GDP did not reach its pre-recession rate until 1983. In spite of this, Thatcher was re-elected in June 1983 with a landslide majority. Inflation had fallen to 3.7%, while interest rates were relatively high at 9.56%. The increase in unemployment was largely due to the government's economic policy which resulted in the closure of outdated factories and coal mines. Manufacturing in England and Wales declined from around 38% of jobs in 1961 to around 22% in 1981. This trend continued for most of the 1980s, with newer industries and the service sector enjoying significant growth. Many jobs were also lost as manufacturing became more efficient and fewer people were required to work in the sector. Unemployment had fallen below 3 million by the time of Thatcher's third successive election victory in June 1987; and by the end of 1989 it was down to 1.6 million.

Britain's economy slid into another global recession in late 1990; it shrank by a total of 6% from peak to trough, and unemployment increased from around 6.9% in spring 1990 to nearly 10.7% by the end of 1993. However, inflation dropped from 10.9% in 1990 to 1.3% three years later. The subsequent economic recovery was extremely strong, and unlike after the early 1980s recession, the recovery saw a rapid and substantial fall in unemployment, which was down to 7.2% by 1997, although the popularity of the Conservative government had failed to improve with the economic upturn. The government won a fourth successive election in 1992 under John Major, who had succeeded Thatcher in November 1990, but soon afterwards came Black Wednesday, which damaged the Conservative government's reputation for economic competence, and from that stage onwards, the Labour Party was ascendant in the opinion polls, particularly in the immediate aftermath of Tony Blair's election as party leader in July 1994 following the sudden death of his predecessor John Smith.

Despite two recessions, wages grew consistently by around 2% per year in real terms from 1980 until 1997, and continued to grow until 2008.

=== 1997 to 2009 ===
In May 1997, Labour, led by Tony Blair, won the general election following 18 years of Conservative government. The Labour Government inherited a strong economy with low inflation, falling unemployment, and a current account surplus. Blair ran on a platform of New Labour which was characterised largely by the continuation of neo-liberal economic policies, but also supporting a strong welfare state. In Britain it was largely viewed as a combination of socialist and capitalist policies, being dubbed 'Third Way'. Four days after the election, Gordon Brown, the new Chancellor of the Exchequer, gave the Bank of England the freedom to control monetary policy, which until then had been directed by the government.

During Blair's 10 years in office there were 40 successive quarters of economic growth, lasting until the second quarter of 2008. GDP growth, which had briefly reached 4% per year in the early 1990s, gently declining thereafter, was relatively anaemic compared to prior decades, such as the 6.5% per year peak in the early 1970s, although growth was smoother and more consistent. Annual growth rates averaged 2.68% between 1992 and 2007, with the finance sector accounting for a greater part than previously. The period saw one of the highest GDP growth rates of any developed economy and the strongest of any European nation. At the same time, household debt rose from £420 billion in 1994 to £1 trillion in 2004 and £1.46 trillion in 2008 – more than the entire GDP of the UK. Total government, business, household and financial sector debt reached 469% of GDP in 2008. For historical comparison, total UK debt was 286% of GDP in 1947, after the Second World War, and 110% in 1980.

This extended period of growth ended in Q2 of 2008 when the United Kingdom entered the Great Recession brought about by the 2008 financial crisis. The UK was particularly vulnerable to the crisis because its financial sector was the most highly leveraged of any major economy. Beginning with the collapse of Northern Rock, which was taken into public ownership in February 2008, other banks had to be partly nationalised. The Royal Bank of Scotland Group, at its peak the fifth-largest bank in the world by market capitalisation, was effectively nationalised in October 2008. By mid-2009, HM Treasury had a 70.33% controlling shareholding in RBS, and a 43% shareholding, through the UK Financial Investments Limited, in Lloyds Banking Group. The Great Recession, as it came to be known, saw unemployment rise from just over 1.6 million in January 2008 to nearly 2.5 million by October 2009.

In August 2008 the IMF warned that the country's outlook had worsened due to a twin shock: financial turmoil and rising commodity prices. Both developments harmed the UK more than most developed countries, as it obtained revenue from exporting financial services while running deficits in goods and commodities, including food. In 2007, the UK had the world's third largest current account deficit, due mainly to a large deficit in manufactured goods. In May 2008, the IMF advised the UK government to broaden the scope of fiscal policy to promote external balance. The UK's output per hour worked was on a par with the average for the "old" EU-15 countries.

=== 2009 to 2020 ===
In March 2009, the Bank of England (BoE) cut interest rates to a then-historic low of 0.5% and began quantitative easing (QE) to boost lending and shore up the economy. The UK exited the Great Recession in Q4 of 2009 having experienced six consecutive quarters of negative growth, shrinking by 6.03% from peak to trough, making it the longest recession since records began and the deepest since the Second World War. Gordon Brown, the then prime minister, described the recession as "a one-off cost for globalisation". Support for Labour slumped during the recession, and the general election of 2010 resulted in a coalition government being formed by the Conservatives and the Liberal Democrats.

In 2011, household, financial, and business debts stood at 420% of GDP in the UK. (Note: Compared to 279% in Japan, 253% in France, 209% in the United States, 206% in Canada, and 198% in Germany.) As the world's most indebted country, spending and investment were held back after the recession, creating economic malaise. However, it was recognised that government borrowing, which rose from 52% to 76% of GDP, had helped to avoid a 1930s-style depression. Within three years of the general election, government cuts aimed at reducing the budget deficit had led to public sector job losses well into six figures, but the private sector enjoyed strong jobs growth.

The ten years following the Great Recession were characterised by extremes. In 2015, employment was at its highest since records began, and GDP growth had become the fastest in the Group of Seven (G7) and Europe, but workforce productivity was the worst since the 1820s, with any growth attributed to a fall in working hours. Output per hour worked was 18% below the average for the rest of the G7. Real wage growth was the worst since the 1860s, and the Governor of the Bank of England described it as a lost decade. Wages fell by 10% in real terms in the eight years to 2016, whilst they grew across the OECD by an average of 6.7%. For 2015 as a whole, the current account deficit rose to a record high of 5.2% of GDP (£96.2bn), the highest in the developed world. In Q4 2015, it exceeded 7%, a level not witnessed during peacetime since records began in 1772. The UK relied on foreign investors to plug the shortfall in its balance of payments. Homes had become less affordable, a problem exacerbated by QE, without which house prices would have fallen by 22%, according to the BoE's own analysis.

The Great Recession had a long term effect on UK's growth; GDP growth slowed from an annual average of 3.0% between 1993 and 2007 to 1.5% between 2009 and 2023, while labour productivity growth slowed from an annual average of 1.9% between 1993 and 2008 to 0.4% between 2008 and 2023. Additionally, growth in GDP per capita, household income and average earnings since 2008 has been significantly below the pre-Great Recession trend. The Washington Post wrote in 2026 that the UK had "never fully recovered from the 2008 financial crash".

A rise in unsecured household debt added to questions over the sustainability of the economic recovery in 2016. The BoE insisted there was no cause for alarm, despite having said two years earlier that the recovery was "neither balanced nor sustainable". (Note: It was still very unbalanced, with consumption accounting for 100% of growth in that year.) Following the UK's 2016 decision to leave the European Union, the BoE cut interest rates to a new historic low of 0.25% for just over a year. It also increased the amount of QE since the start of the Great Recession to £435bn. By Q4 2018 net borrowing in the UK was the highest in the OECD at 5% of GDP. (Note: For comparison, Germany saved 9% of GDP and Russia saved 5%, while Japan, Greece, Spain, Italy and China saved between 1% and 3%.) Households had been in deficit for an unprecedented nine quarters in a row. Since the Great Recession, the country was no longer making a profit on its foreign investments.

=== 2020 to present ===
In March 2020, in response to the COVID-19 pandemic, a temporary ban was imposed on non-essential business and travel in the UK. The BoE cut the base rate to a new historic low of 0.1%. Economic growth had been weak before the crisis, with zero growth in Q4 2019. By May 2020, 23% of the British workforce was furloughed (temporarily laid off). Government schemes were launched to help affected workers. In the first half of 2020, GDP shrank by 22.6%, the deepest recession in UK history and worse than any other G7 or European country. During 2020 the BoE purchased £450 billion of government bonds, taking the amount of quantitative easing since the start of the Great Recession to £895 billion. Overall, GDP shrank by 10.3% in 2020, making it the worst contraction since the Great Frost paralysed the economy in 1709.

In 2021 consumer price inflation (CPI) began rising sharply due to higher energy and transport costs. The BoE responded by gradually increasing the base rate, which would peak at 5.25% in August 2023. Global inflation rates were the highest in 40 years owing to the pandemic and Russia's invasion of Ukraine. The UK had the highest domestic electricity prices and amongst the highest gas prices in Europe, contributing to a cost of living crisis. In 2022 the BoE began quantitative tightening (a reversal of QE) by either not renewing mature government bonds or offloading bonds to private investors, signalling the end to an era of easy borrowing. Annual CPI peaked at 11.1% in October 2022. Cumulatively, prices rose by 30.7% from January 2021 to June 2026. By contrast, prices had risen by a total of 8.7% over the preceding five and a half years.

In August 2023, the ONS announced that nominal GDP had surpassed its pre-COVID-19 size in the final quarter of 2021. GDP per capita rose by 0.7% a year on average from 2007 to 2024, in contrast with 2.5% a year during the global credit bubble from 1990 to 2007. In early 2024, average wages in the UK reached roughly the same level in real terms as they had been in 2008. As of March 2026, the overall UK unemployment rate was 5%, up from 3.8% in February 2024, and youth unemployment reached 16.2%, the highest since 2014. A prolonged downturn in the job market started in mid-2024 owing to higher employment costs and the workplace adoption of AI. According to payroll data, 237,897 jobs were lost from October 2024 to August 2026, with retail, hospitality and manufacturing some of the hardest hit sectors.

== Economic charts ==
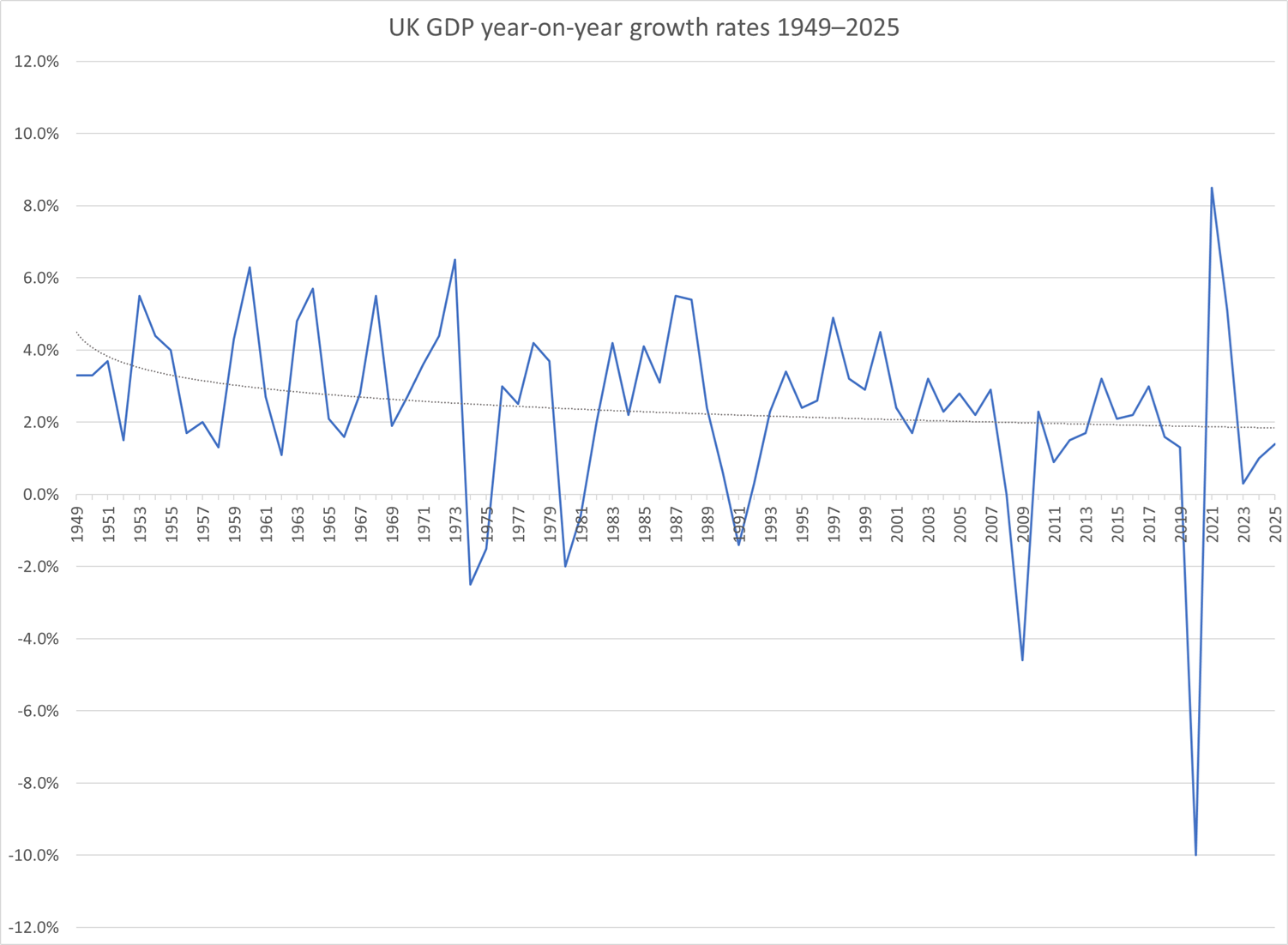
Real GDP year-on-year growth, 1949–2025

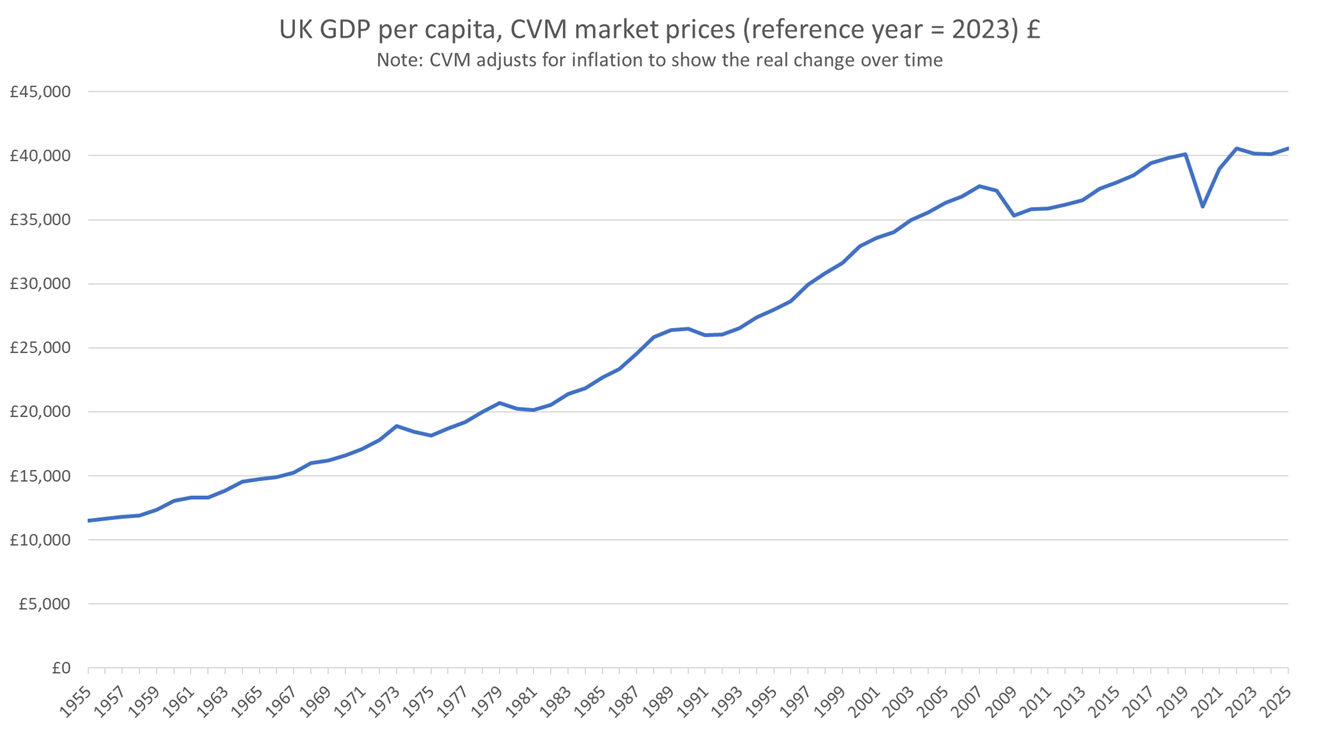
Real GDP per capita, 1955–2025

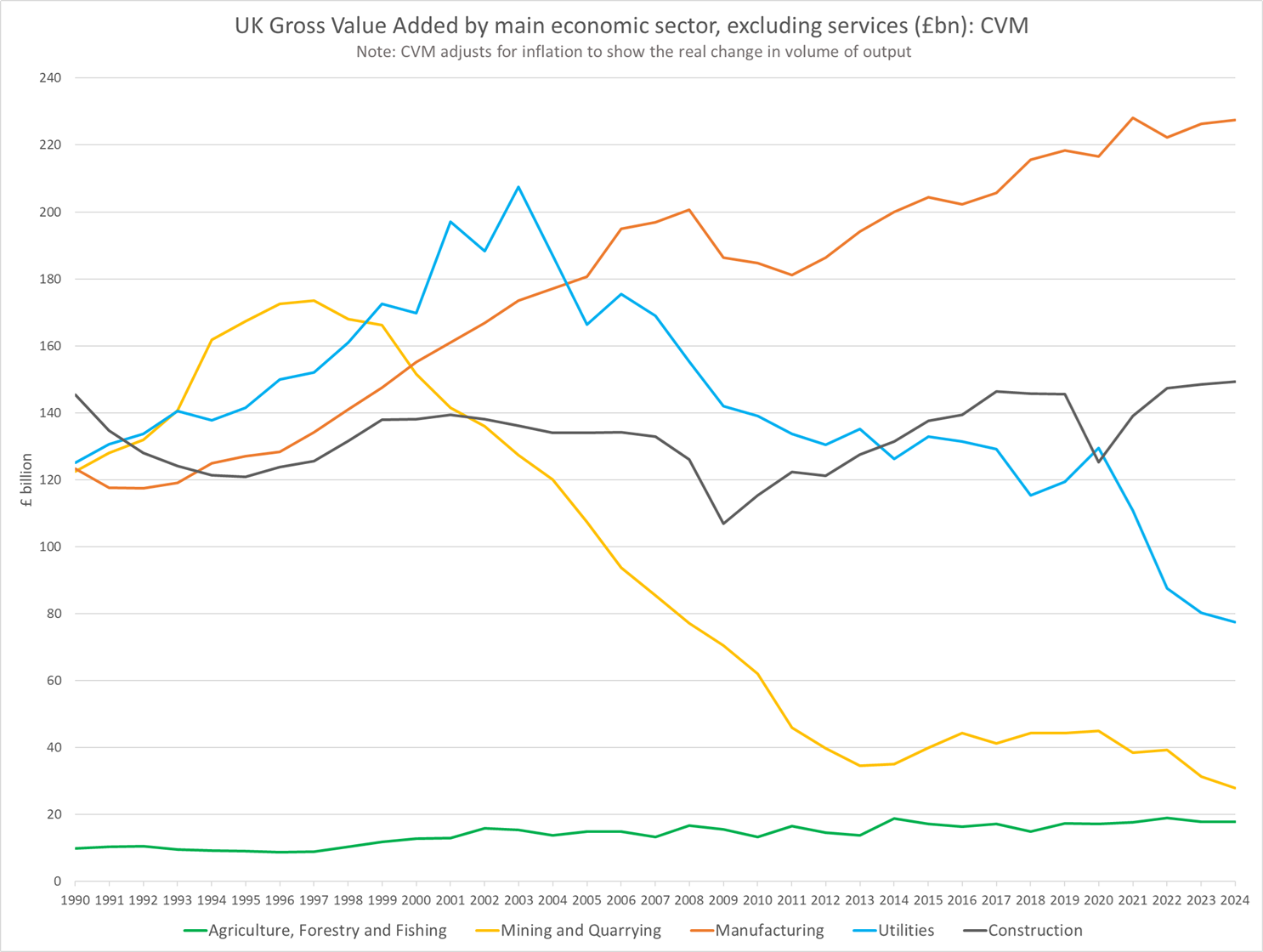
Gross value added by sector (excluding services) inflation adjusted, 1990–2024

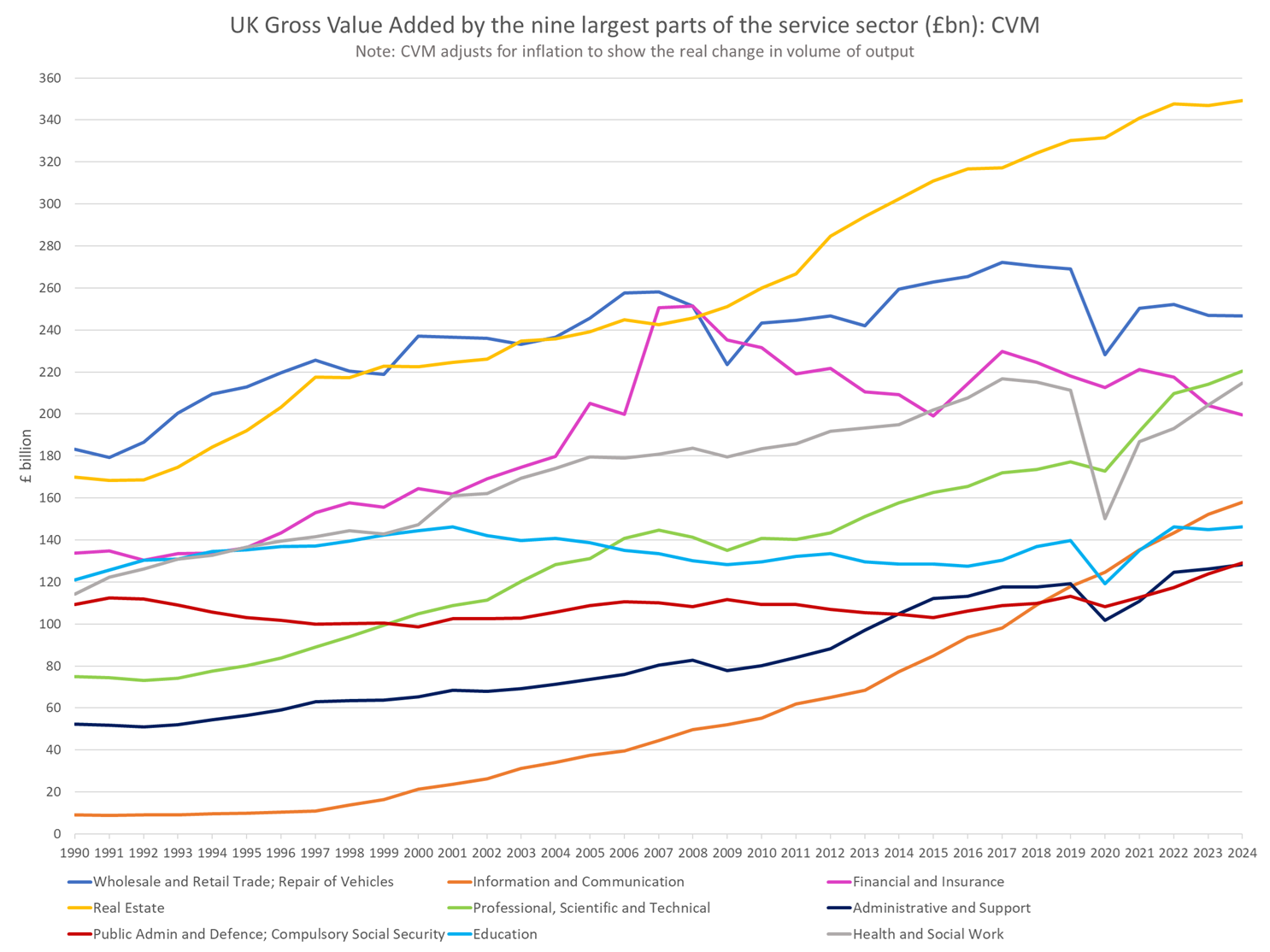
Gross value added by the nine largest parts of the service sector, inflation adjusted, 1990–2024

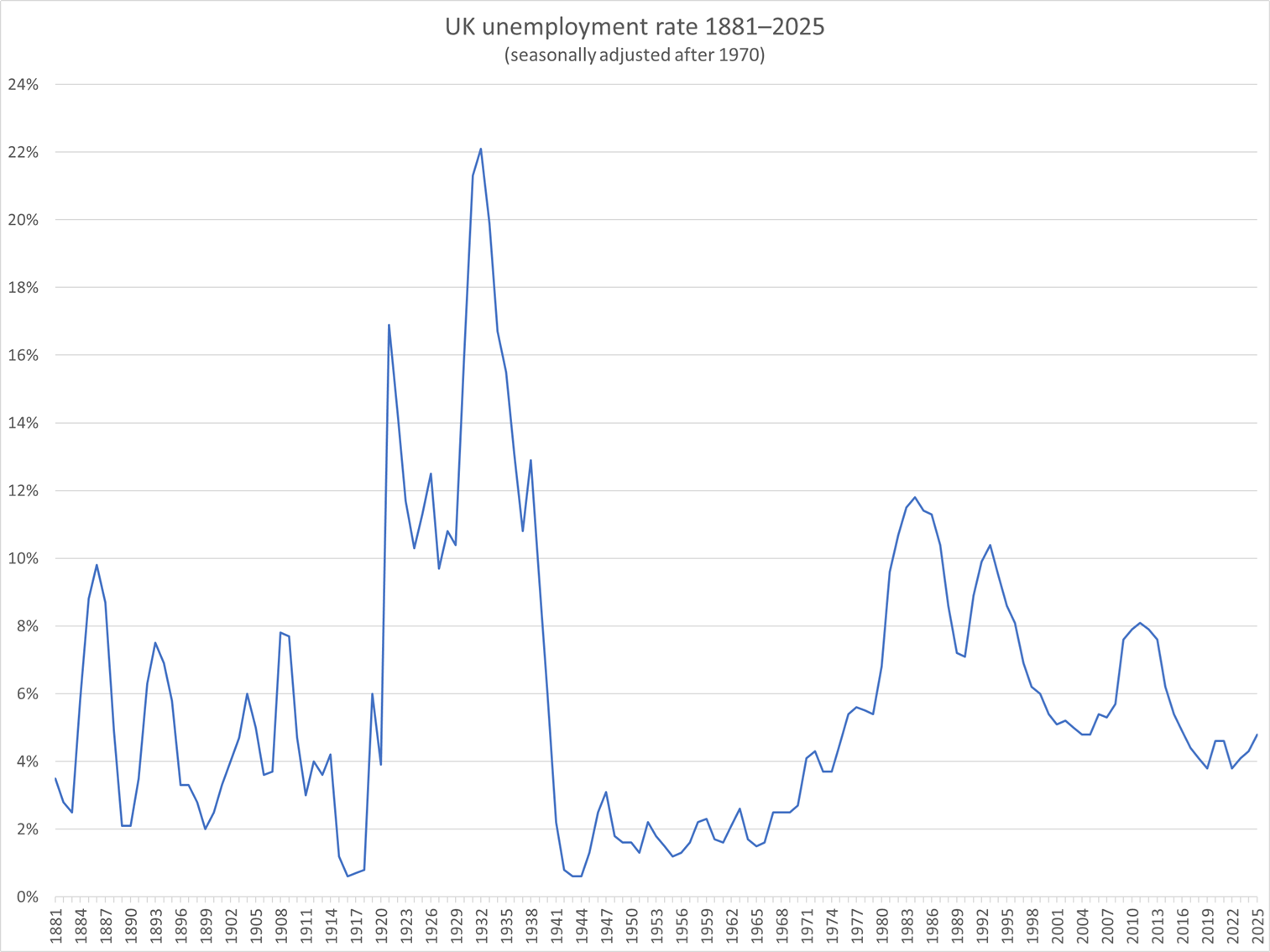
Unemployment rate, 1881–2025

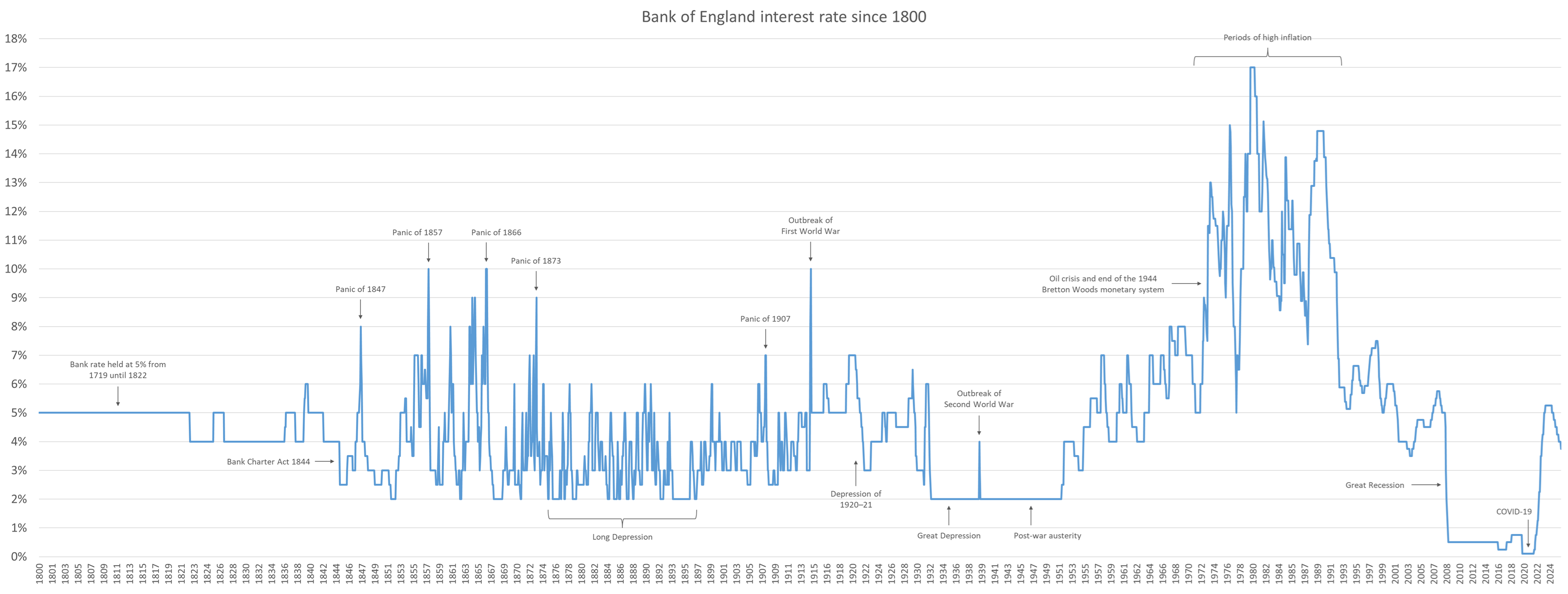
Bank of England interest rate, 1800–2025

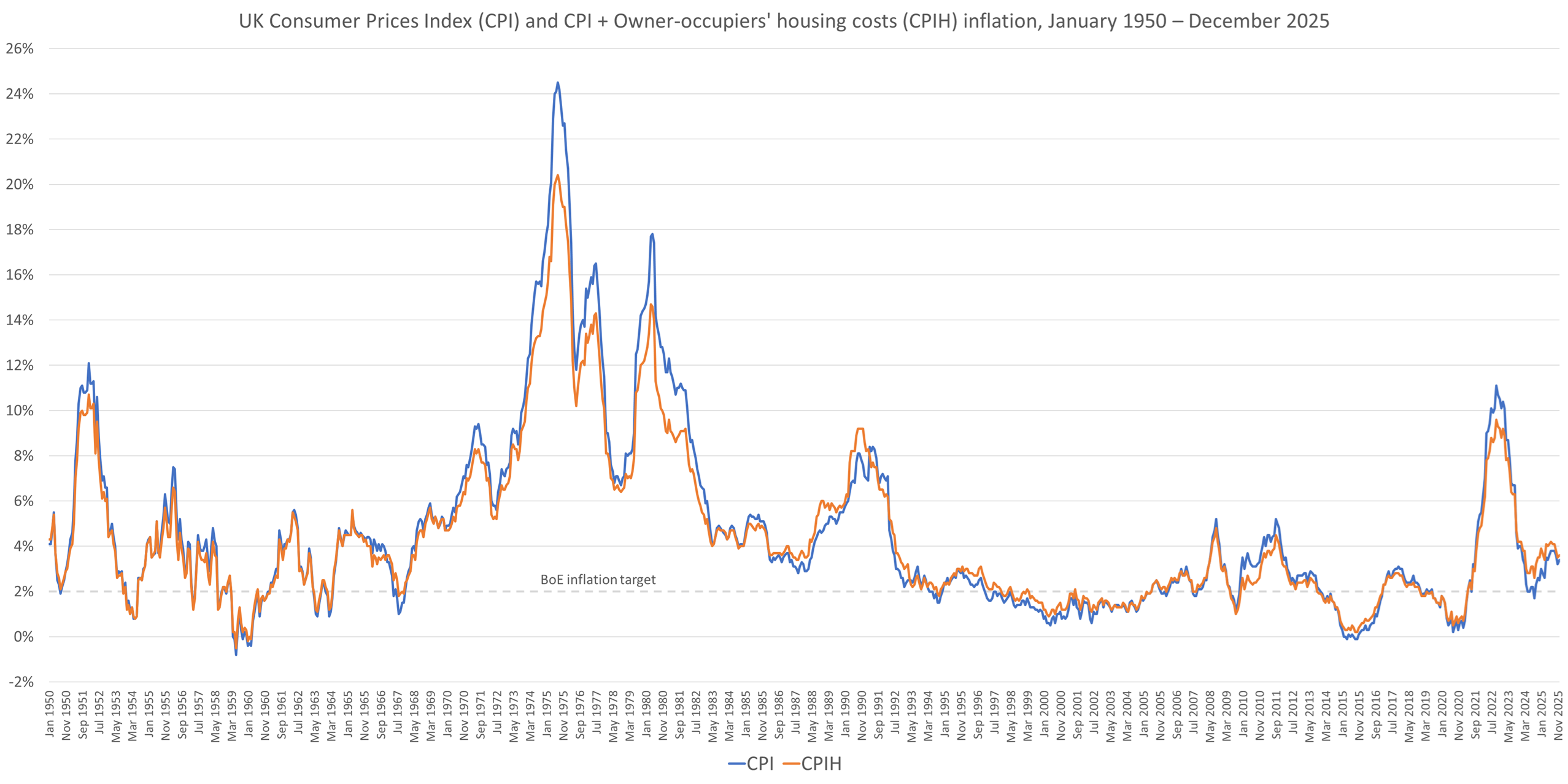
CPI and CPIH inflation, 1950–2025

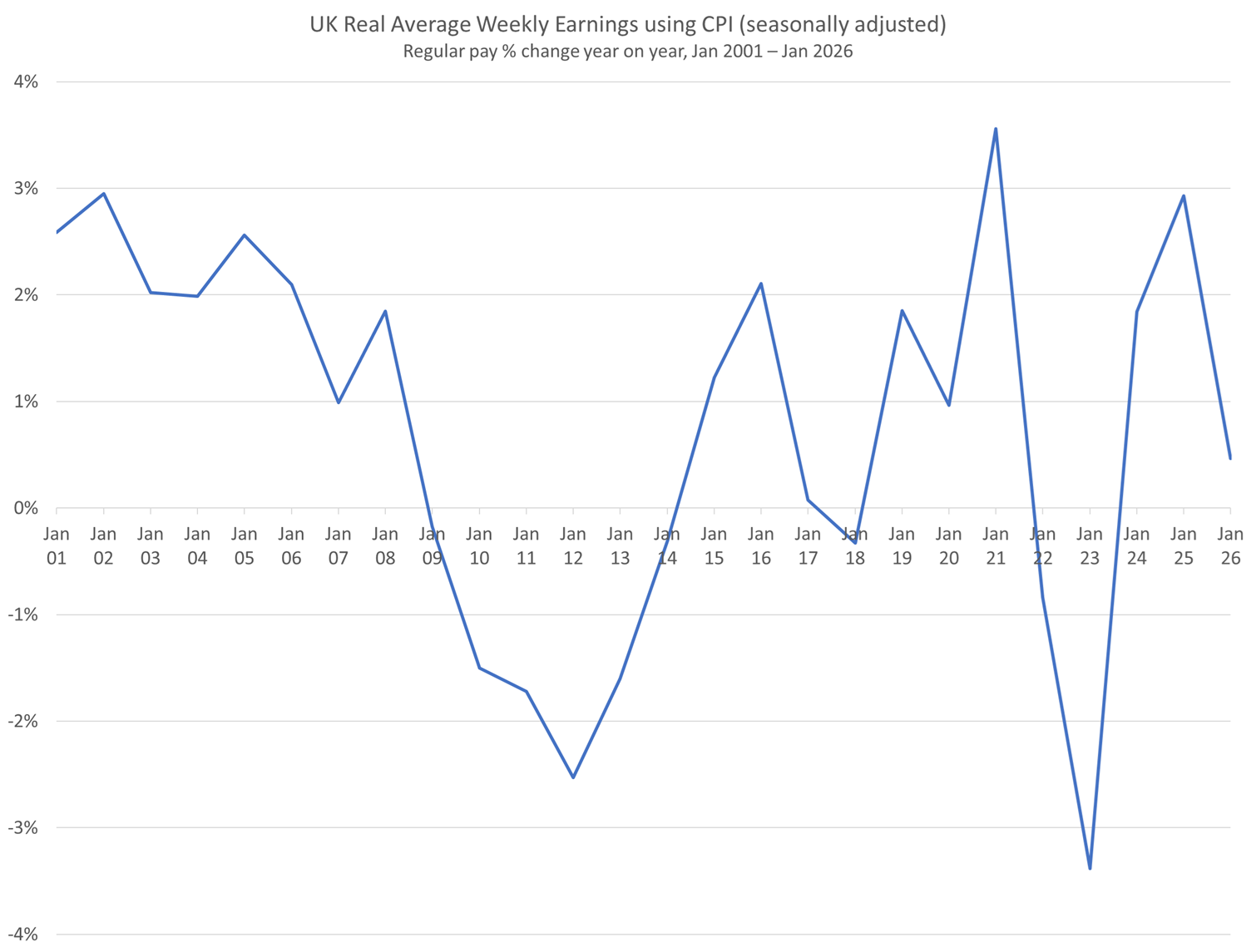
Real earnings growth (YoY), January 2001 to January 2026

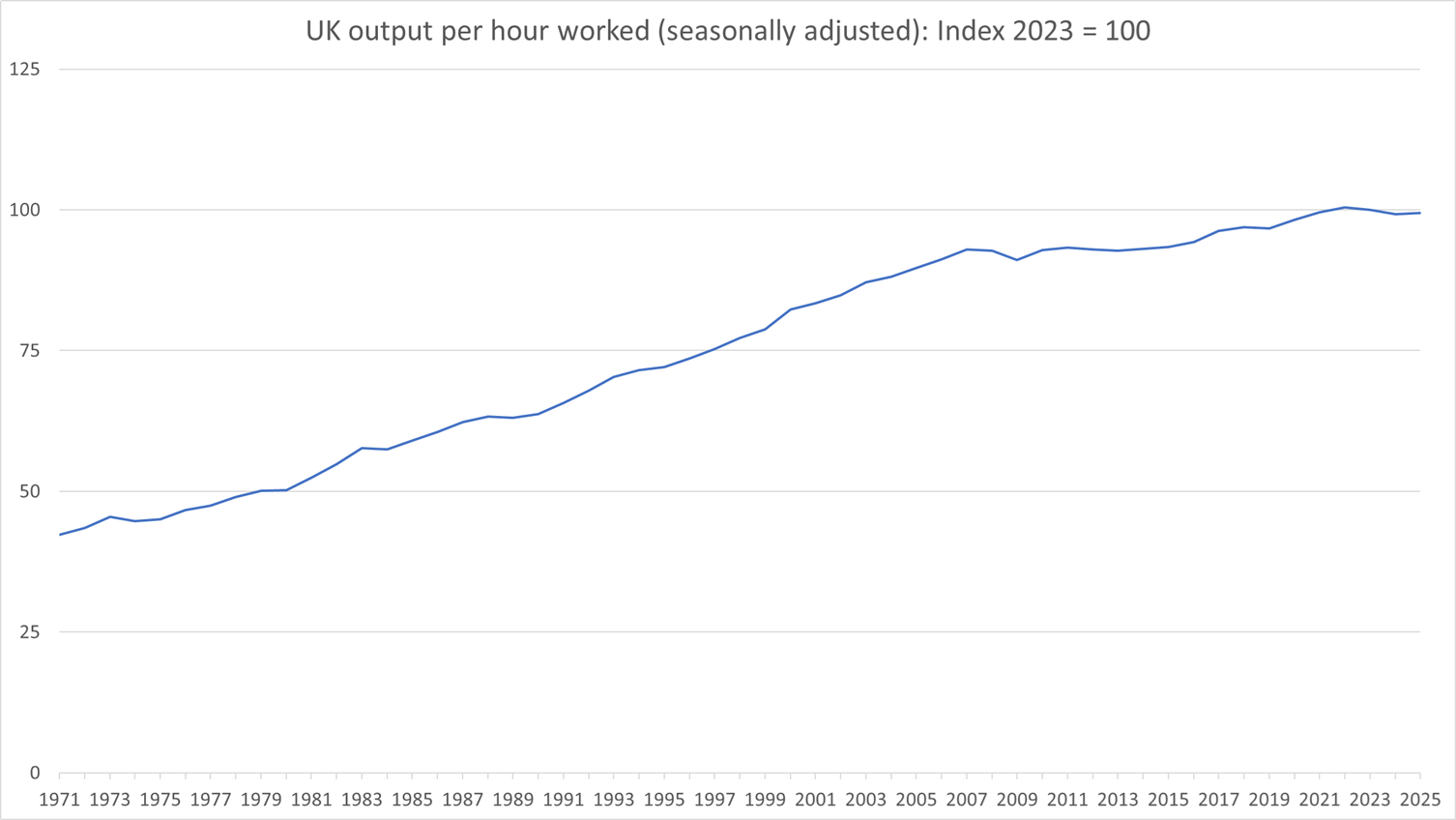
Productivity, 1971–2025

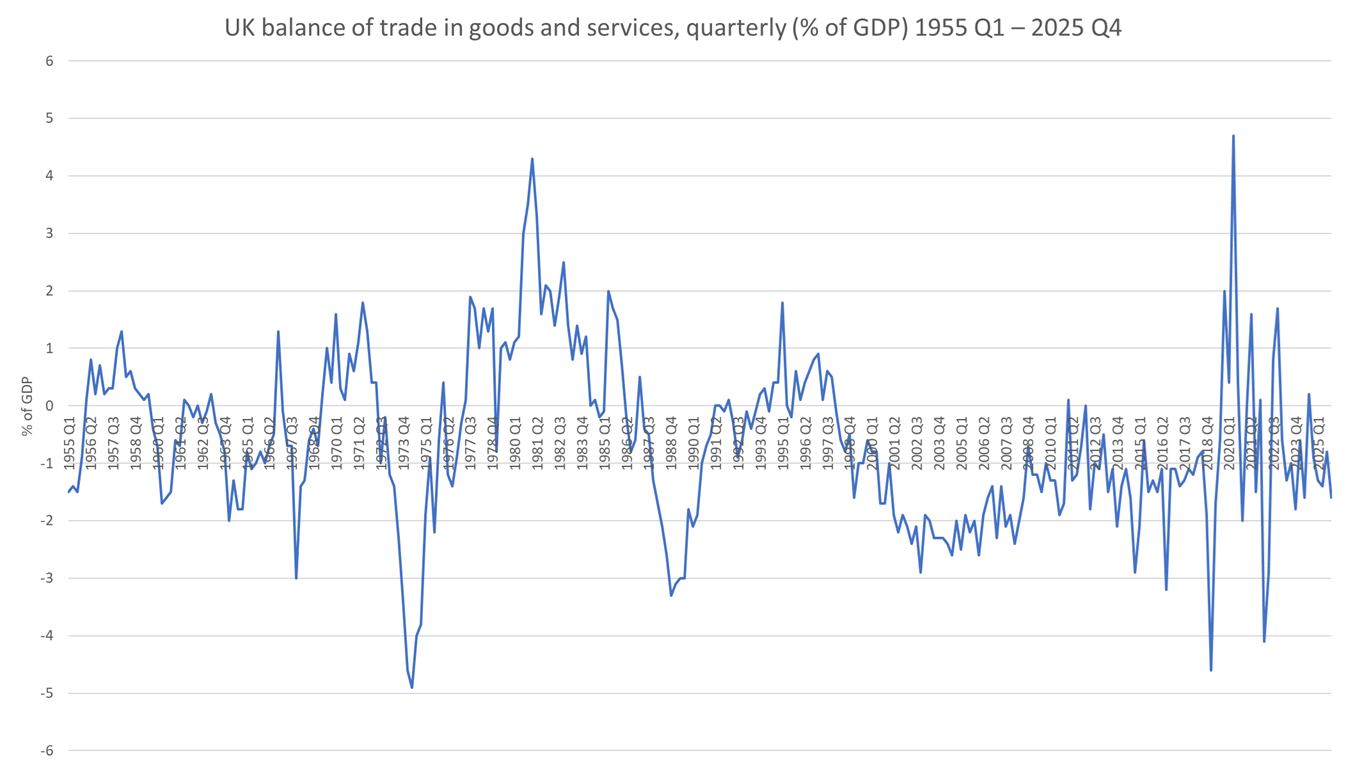
Balance of trade as % of GDP, 1955–2025

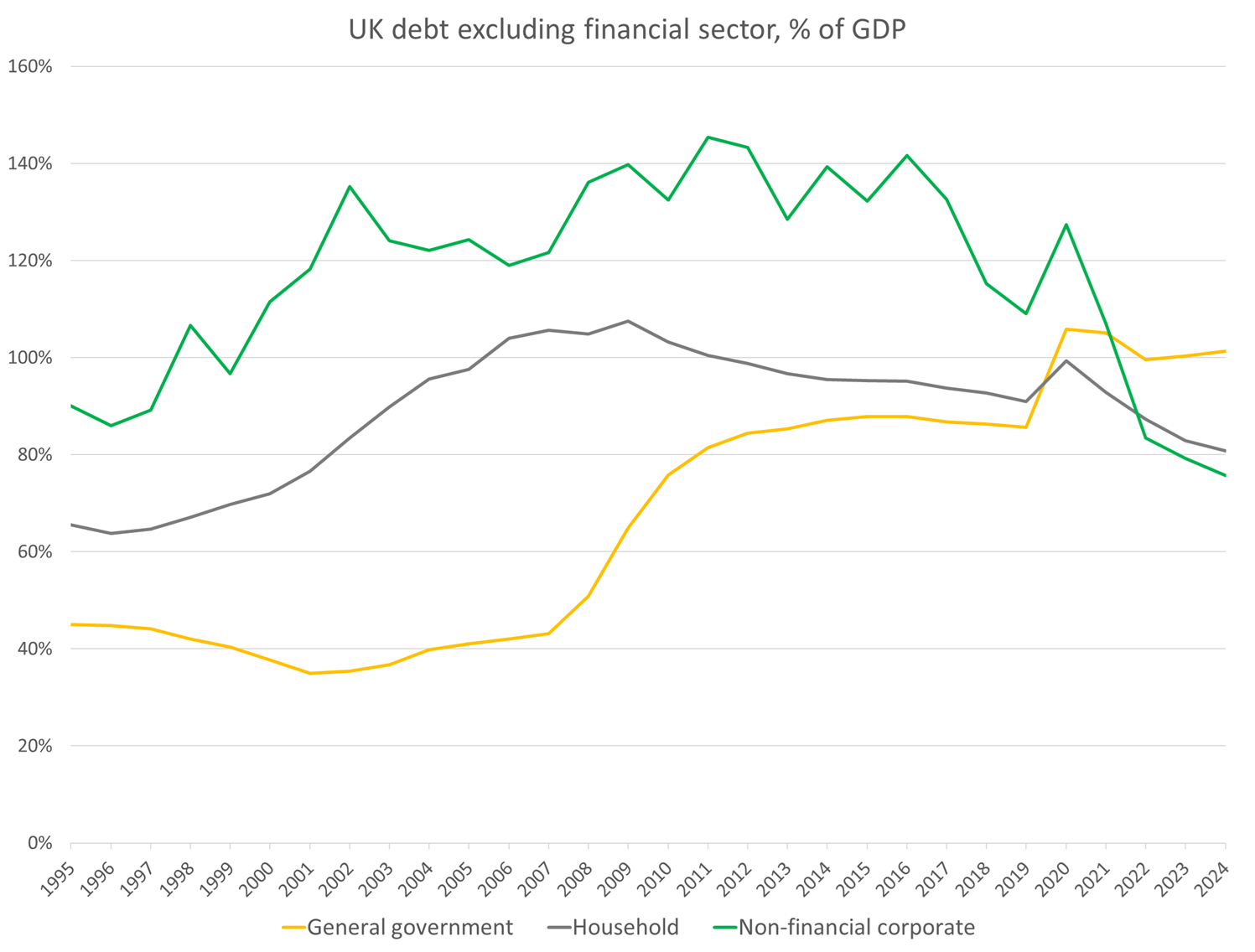
Government, household, and corporate debt (excluding financial sector) as % of GDP, 1995–2024

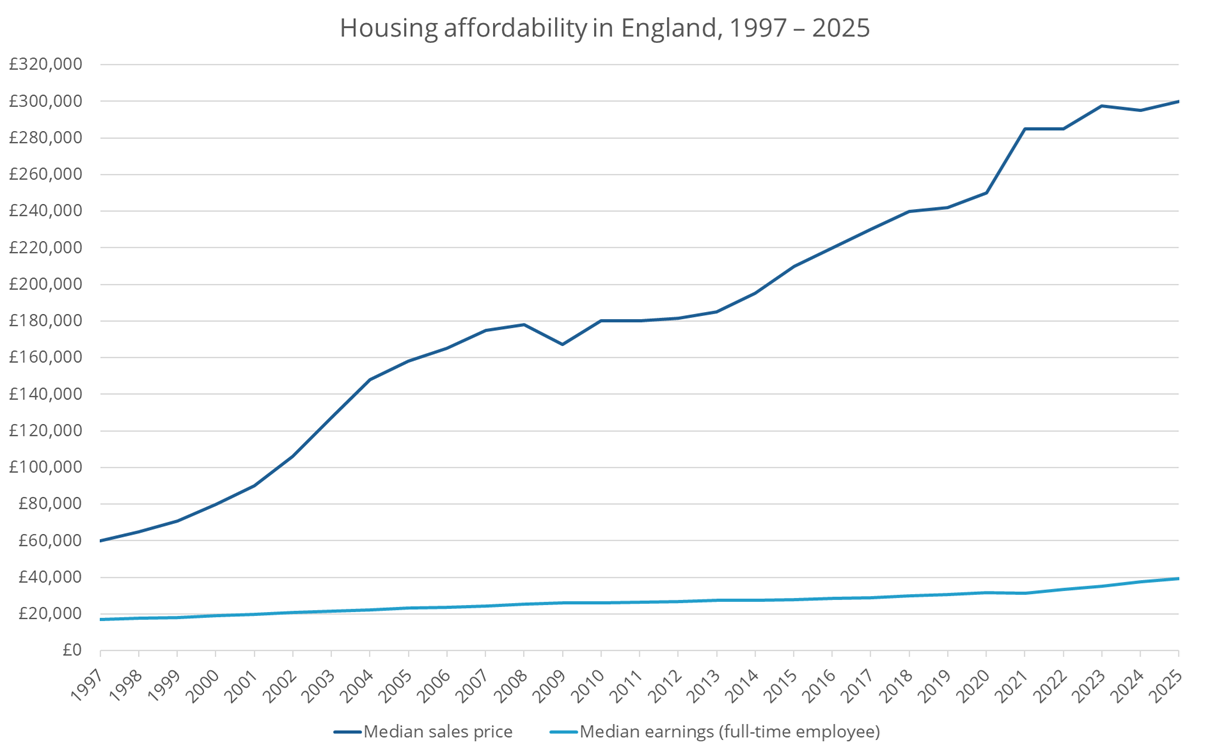
Median house prices compared to earnings in England, 1997–2025

== Government spending and economic management ==
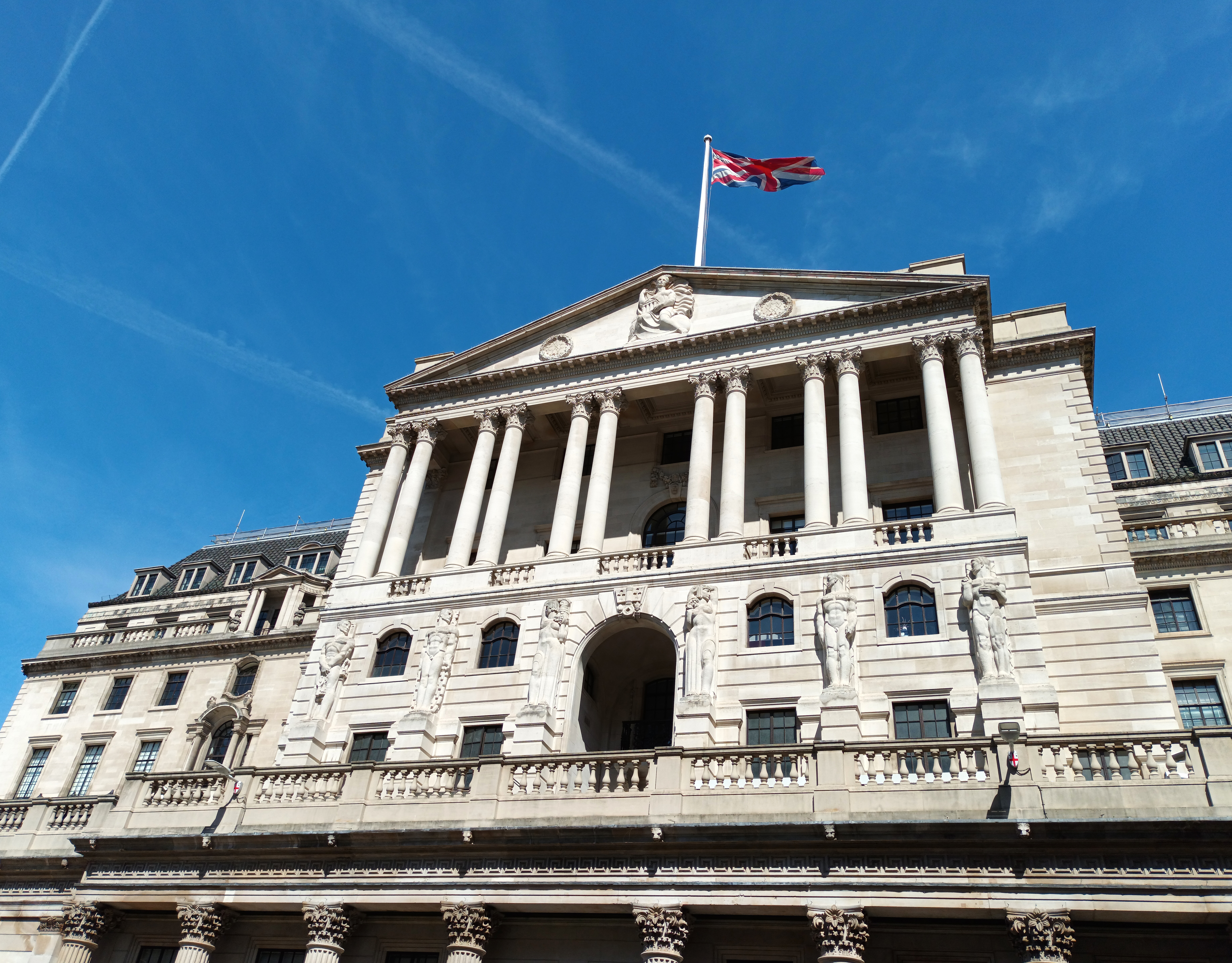
The Bank of England, London, is the central bank of the United Kingdom.

Government involvement in the economy is primarily exercised by HM Treasury, headed by the Chancellor of the Exchequer, who is responsible for setting fiscal policy. In recent years, the UK economy has been managed in accordance with principles of market liberalisation and low taxation and regulation. Since 1997, the Bank of England's Monetary Policy Committee, headed by the Governor of the Bank of England, has been responsible for setting interest rates at the level necessary to help achieve a 2% inflation target. The Bank's Financial Policy Committee was created in 2011 to monitor and protect the UK's financial stability.

At the start of the 20th century, government spending in the United Kingdom was equivalent to 15% of GDP, rising to 25% during the interwar period, and has averaged around 35–45% since the end of the Second World War. At the beginning of 2008, the UK national debt stood at around 35% of GDP. As a result of the 2008 financial crisis and the Great Recession, government borrowing increased during 2009, partly as a result of the cost of a series of bank bailouts. In terms of net government debt as a percentage of GDP, at the end of 2014 public sector net debt excluding financial sector interventions was 81.5% of GDP. It rose sharply again during the COVID-19 pandemic to reach 98% of GDP, another unprecedented increase for peacetime.

Taxation in the United Kingdom may involve payments to at least two different levels of government: local government and central government (HM Revenue & Customs). Local government is financed by grants from central government funds, business rates, council tax, and, increasingly, fees and charges such as those from on-street parking. Central government revenues are mainly from income tax, National Insurance contributions, value added tax (VAT), corporation tax and fuel duty. Under the Scotland Act 2016, the Scottish Parliament has the devolved power to vary income tax rates, adjust income tax thresholds, and alter the number of tax bands that apply to residents of Scotland.

== Sectors ==
The UK's Office for National Statistics' Blue Book divides the UK economy into 10 broad categories, to list their contribution to the UK economy in terms of Gross value added and employment income (as measured by employee compensation). These are

Contributions to the UK economy by sector in 2023
Sector	GVA (£bn)	% of GVA	Employee compensation (£bn)	% of employee compensation
Agriculture (Note: Agriculture, forestry and fishing)	17.839	0.7	5.00	0.4
Construction	148.457	5.9	61.00	4.6
Production (Note: Manufacturing; mining, quarrying and hydrocarbons; utilities.)	337.889	13.5	158.00	11.9
Distribution (Note: Hospitality; retail and wholesale trade; transport and storage.)	401.728	16.1	266.00	20.0
Information	152.297	6.1	101.00	7.6
Financial	204.046	8.2	99.00	7.4
Real Estate	346.849	13.9	20.00	1.5
Professional	340.424	13.6	215.00	16.2
Government (Note: Education; health and social work; public administration and defence. Note that a significant portion of health and education in the UK is provided by non-government entities such as universities.)	473.216	18.9	366.00	27.6
Other Services	74.645	3.0	40.00	3.0
Total	2,497.39	–	1,331.00	–

=== Agriculture, forestry and fishing ===
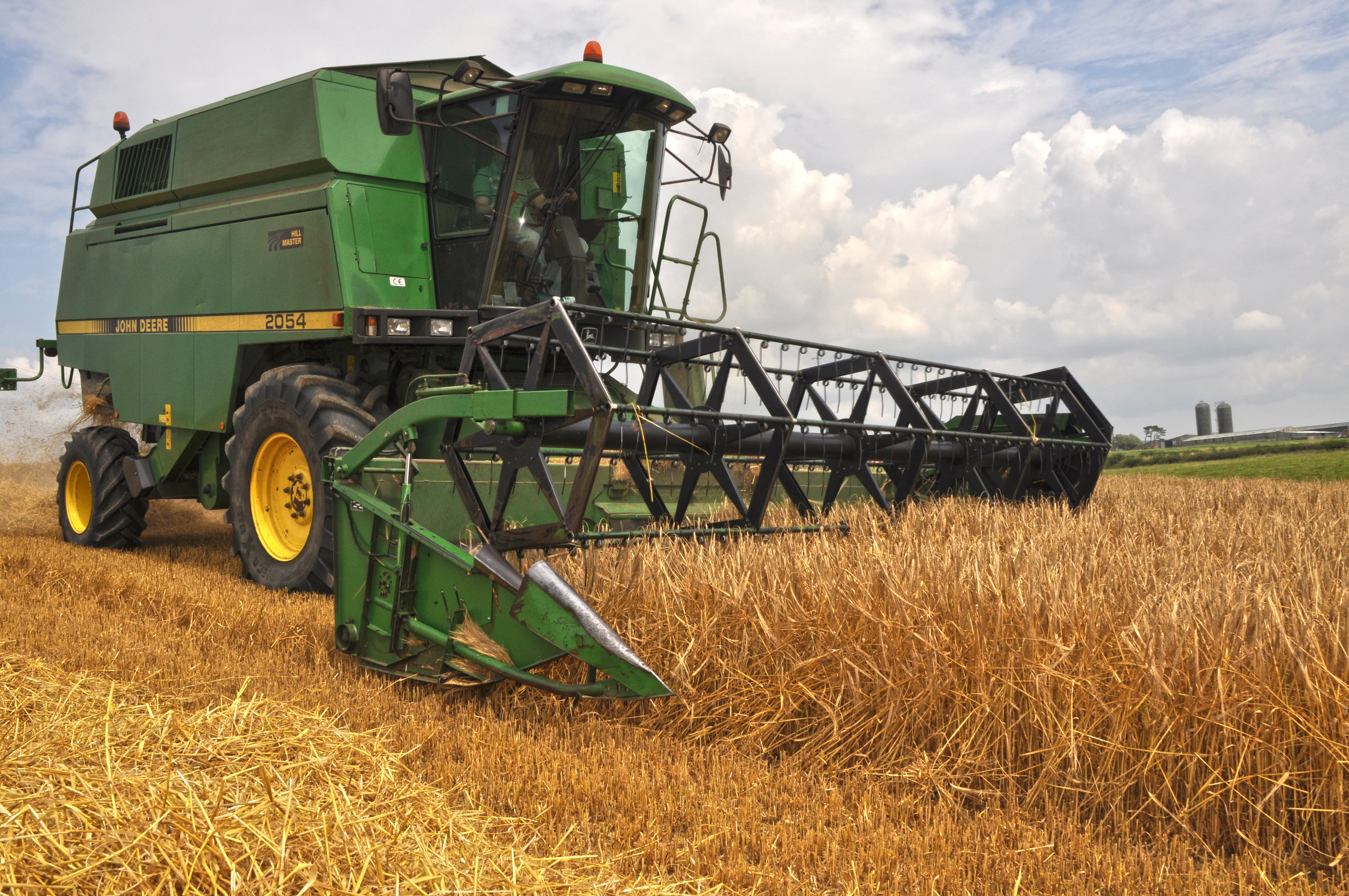
Wheat harvesting in Devon, England

Agriculture in the UK is intensive, highly mechanised, and efficient by European standards. The country produces 62% of its food needs. The self-sufficiency level was just under 50% in the 1950s, peaking at 80% in the 1980s, before gradually declining to its present level.

Agriculture, forestry and fishing added gross value of £18.53 billion to the UK economy in 2024. The sector contributes 0.6% of the UK's national GDP. The estimated number of jobs in the sector was 355,000 as of March 2026. Approximately two-thirds of agriculture production by value is devoted to livestock and one-third to arable crops.

The main contributions to livestock output were milk (£6.3bn), beef (£4.15bn), poultry (£3.35bn), pigmeat (£1.84bn), mutton and lamb (£1.76bn) and eggs (£1.35bn).

The main contributions to crop output were wheat (£2.16bn), fresh vegetables (£2.03bn), plants and flowers (£1.7bn), potatoes (£1.46bn), barley (£1.16bn) and fruit (£1.08bn).

UK agriculture has become more efficient over the past half a century, with total factor productivity increasing by 51% from 1973 to 2024, driven by a 32% increase in the output of livestock and crops, and a 13% decrease in the volume of inputs such as seeds and fertilisers.

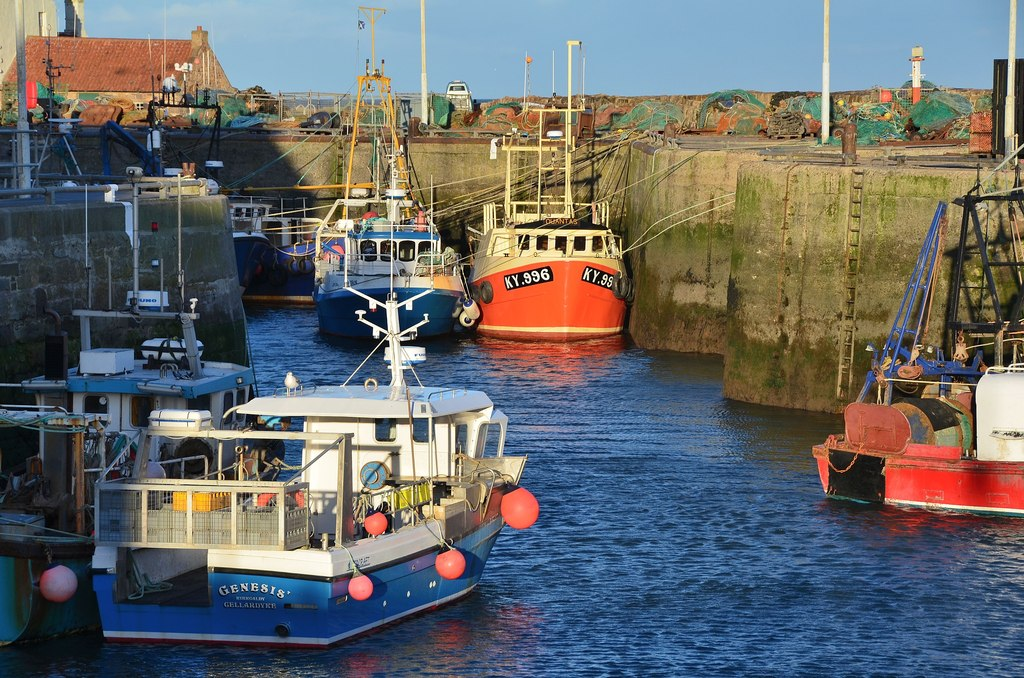
Fishing boats in Fife, Scotland

In 2024 there were 5,232 UK registered fishing vessels, a decrease of 52% since 1994. The vessels landed 745,000 tonnes of sea fish with a value of £1.16 billion. Of the four UK nations, Scotland lands the largest quantity and value of fish, approximately 2.5 times more than England. The UK tonnage of fish landed rose significantly from 553,000 tonnes in 1887 to a peak of 1.2 million in 1913 and began to decline steadily from the mid-1970s.

In 2022 the UK aquaculture industry farmed 217,000 tonnes of fish and shellfish, worth £1.08bn. Atlantic salmon, farmed in Scotland, accounted for £1.0bn of the value, while rainbow trout, mussels, oysters and carp made up the rest. Around 3,000 people work in the industry, a similar number to the mid-nineties, when production was 93,838 tonnes.

Forestry – producing raw logs, woodchips and firewood – contributed £875 million to UK GDP in 2023, and the industry employs around 21,000 workers.

=== Construction ===
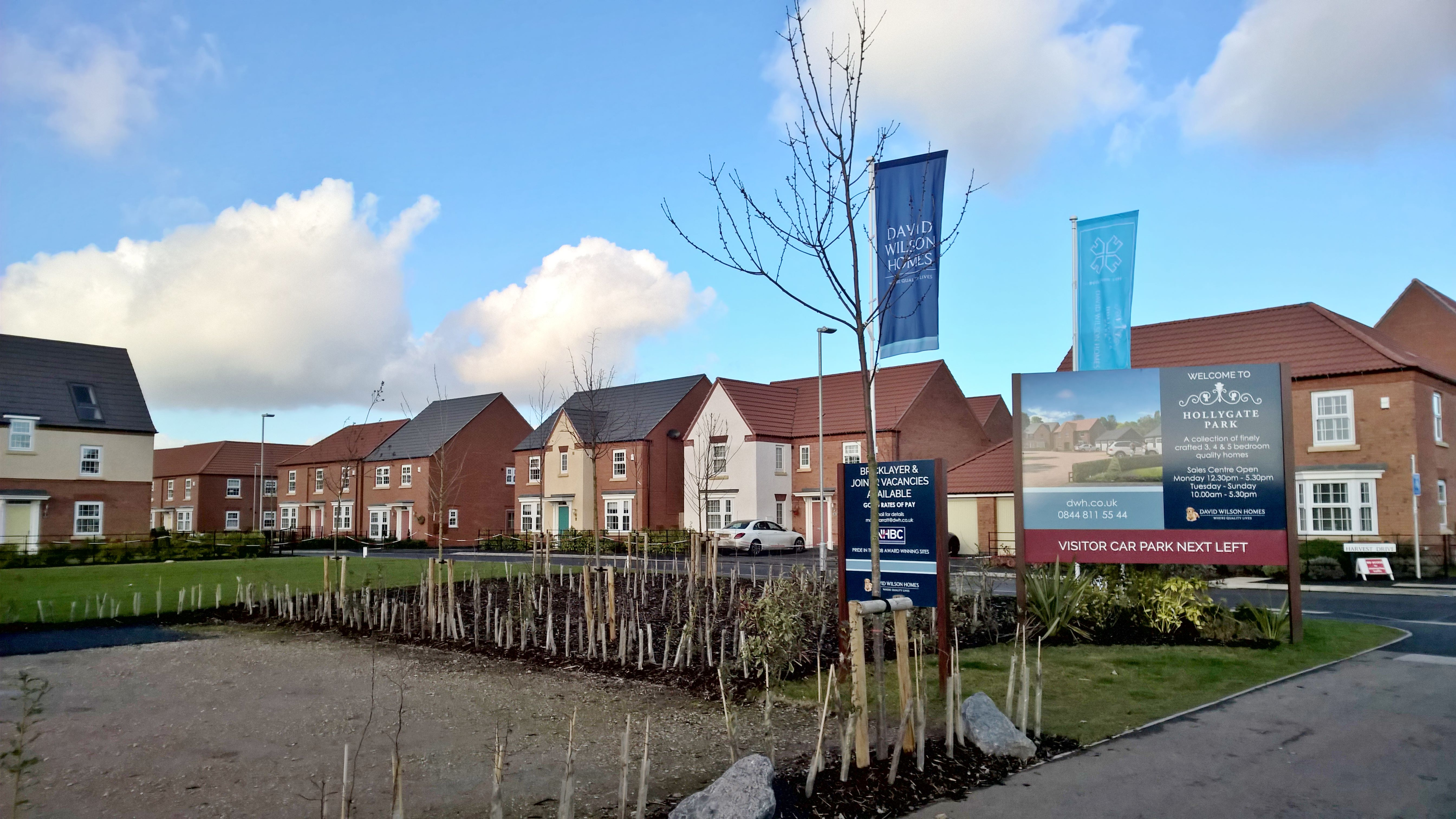
A new housing development in Nottinghamshire

The construction industry contributed gross value of £154.3 billion to the UK economy in 2024. It contributes around 6% to UK GDP, and the number of jobs was estimated at 2.32 million in March 2026. Around 36% of construction workers are self-employed. There is a persistent labour shortage in the industry.

There are 370,770 registered construction firms in the UK, including 56,980 house builders, 44,137 property developers, 21,680 civil engineering firms, and 17,344 non-residential builders. The majority of other companies are engaged in specific trades such as roofing or plastering.

Residential development and infrastructure are the two largest components of gross value added by the construction industry. Housing represents 33% to 40% of new construction output. Infrastructure works, such as transport and utility projects, have grown to account for approximately 25% of new activity in recent years. Construction of offices, retail, and leisure facilities has declined owing to the increasing adoption of remote working and the growth of e-commerce. The remaining share consists of industrial projects, such as factories and warehouses, and of public buildings, including schools and hospitals.

One of the single largest projects in the UK in recent years was Crossrail, costing an estimated £19 billion. It was the largest construction project in Europe at the time. Opened in 2022, the new railway line runs east to west through London and into the surrounding area, with a branch to Heathrow Airport. The main feature of the project is construction of 42 kilometres (26 mi) of new tunnels connecting stations in central London.

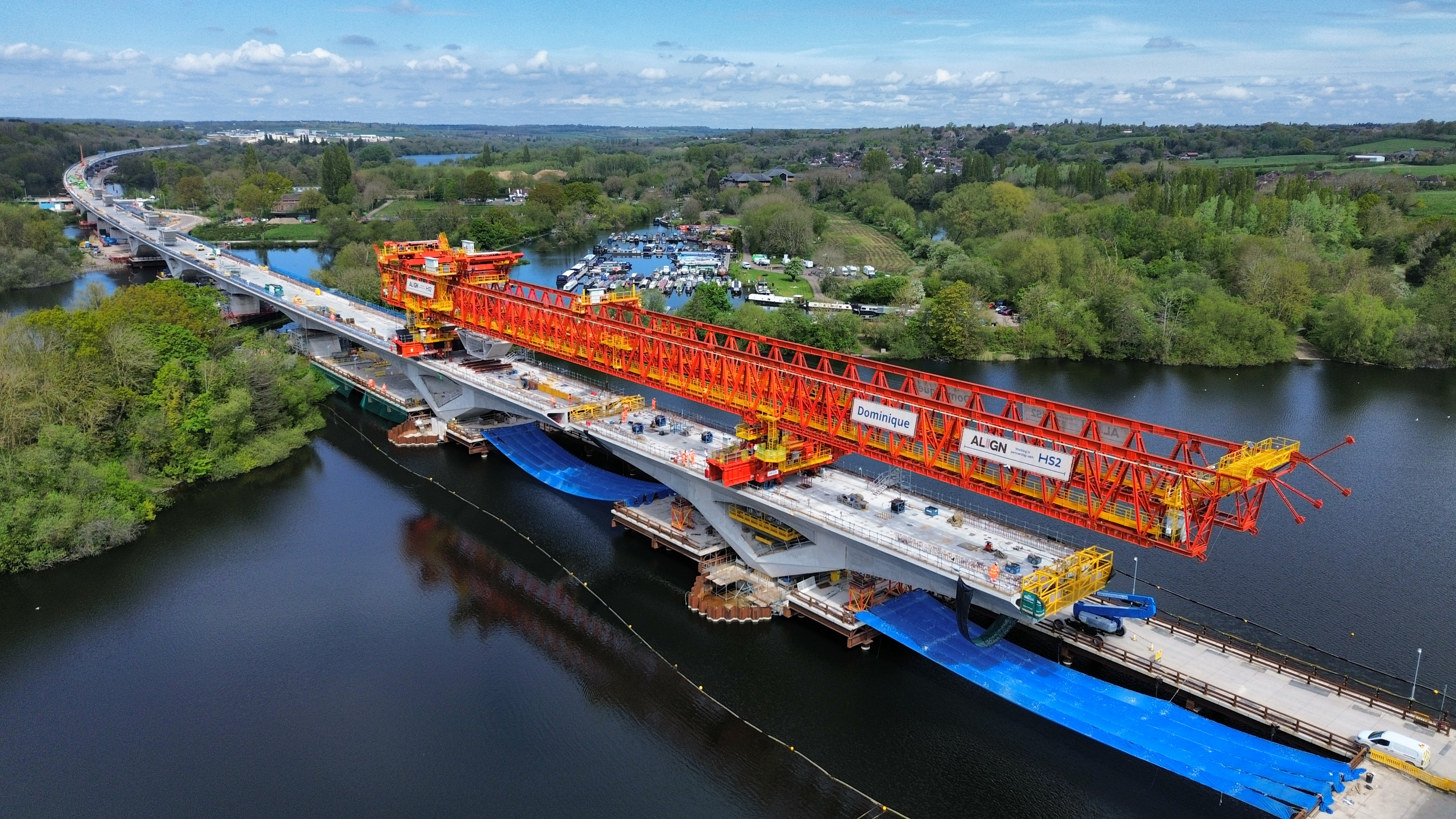
Colne Valley Viaduct, part of the High Speed 2 railway line, under construction in 2024

High Speed 2 (HS2), a new railway line between London and the West Midlands, is one of Europe's largest ongoing infrastructure projects. It is due to be fully completed in the early 2040s and cost between £87.7bn and £102.7bn according to 2026 estimates, although delays and cost overruns have beset the project. HS2 trains are expected to operate at a maximum speed of 320 kilometres per hour (200 mph) – the same as Japan's Shinkansen bullet trains.

Other high-profile building projects either planned or currently under way include Sizewell C and Hickley Point C nuclear power stations, the north runway project at Gatwick Airport, Outer Dowsing 1.5GW wind farm off the coast of Lincolnshire, G Park 1 and 2 data centres in London Docklands, the Great Northern Warehouse redevelopment in Manchester, and Cambridge Cancer Research Hospital.

=== Production industries ===
==== Manufacturing ====
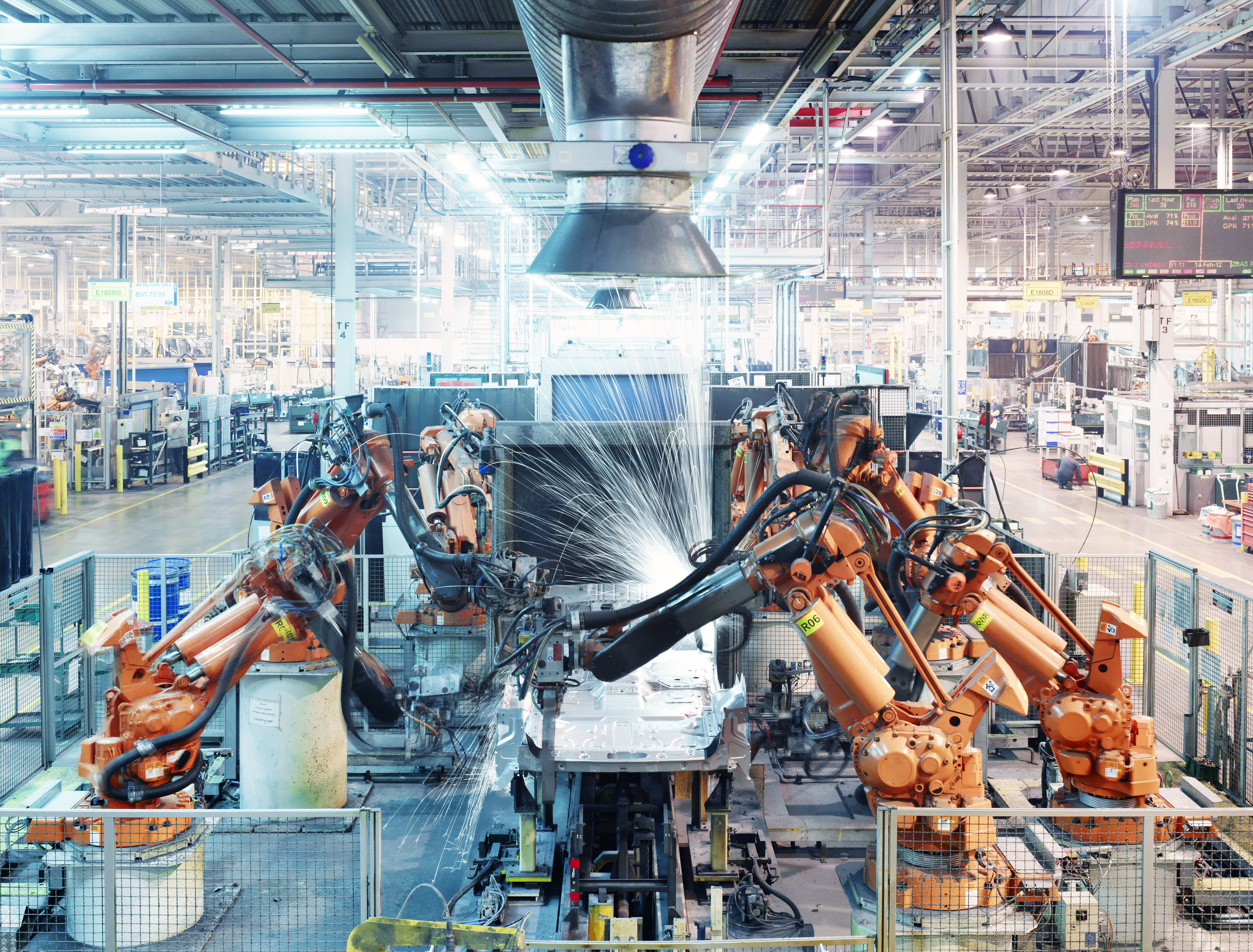
A Land Rover Discovery being made at Jaguar Land Rover's Solihull plant

Manufacturing added gross value of £231.88 billion to national GDP in 2024. The major industries are food, beverages and tobacco (£40.5bn), transport (£30.8bn), metals (£26.1bn), pharmaceuticals (£24.9bn), electronics (£16.5bn), and machinery (£15.1bn).

From 1841 to 1961 around 36.5% of the labour force were employed in manufacturing. By 1981 this had fallen to 23.1%. At the 2021 England and Wales census manufacturing as a share of employment was 7.3%. In March 2026 there were an estimated 2.48 million jobs.

UK manufacturing no longer relies on high volume, low cost mass production. It has become highly specialised and efficient, focusing on high value, research and development intensive products. Between 1997 and 2024, output per hour increased by 202% in the advanced manufacturing sector, compared to 154% for the whole of manufacturing and 33% for the UK economy.

Around 183,000 people are directly employed in the UK automotive manufacturing sector. Total output added gross value of £18 billion to GDP in 2025. In the same year, 717,371 cars were built, 80% of which were exported, and 47,344 commercial vehicles such as vans and lorries. The UK is also home to seven bus and coach manufacturers. A number of companies specialise in making vehicle engines or other components. Car brands made in the UK include Nissan, Land Rover, MINI, Toyota, Jaguar, Bentley, Rolls-Royce, Aston Martin, and Lotus. Car production peaked in 1972 with just under 2 million built. Output fell below 1 million for the first time in 2020. The top five car export markets are the EU (56.7%), US (15%), China (6.3%), Türkiye (5.3%) and Japan (2.9%).

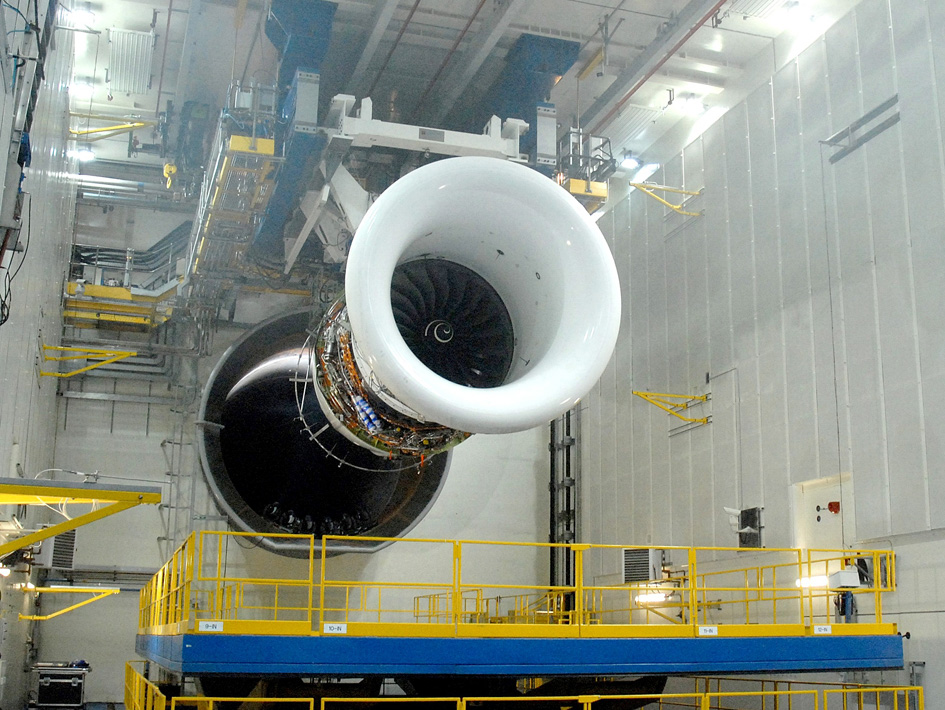
A Rolls-Royce Trent jet engine undergoing tests at Rolls-Royce's aerospace factory in Derby

The aerospace industry of the UK is the second-largest in the world after the United States. In 2025 aerospace contributed £14.3 billion to the economy, having grown by 46% since 2015, and the industry directly employed 113,000 workers. Exports have grown by 61% in a decade to reach £30.6 billion, accounting for 74% of the sector's revenue. Companies with a major presence in the industry include the UK's largest aerospace and defence firm BAE Systems, aircraft engine maker Rolls-Royce, wing producer Airbus UK, missile systems manufacturer MBDA UK, aerostructure and composites supplier GKN, and helicopter builder Leonardo UK.

UK pharmaceutical manufacturing contributed £24.9 billion to GDP in 2024. The industry is in rapid decline due to intense global competition. Between 2009 and 2020 output volumes fell by 29% and 7,000 jobs were lost. In 2010, the UK was the fourth-largest net exporter of pharmaceutical products with a trade surplus of $US9.7 billion. Ten years later the UK had fallen to 98th place with a trade deficit of $1.2 billion, and India occupied fourth position. Globally, the majority of investment in new production facilities and equipment has gone to Ireland, Singapore, Germany, and the US, which offer a more attractive business environment. The UK is home to AstraZeneca and GSK, respectively the world's seventh- and tenth-largest pharmaceutical companies.

==== Mining, quarrying and hydrocarbons ====
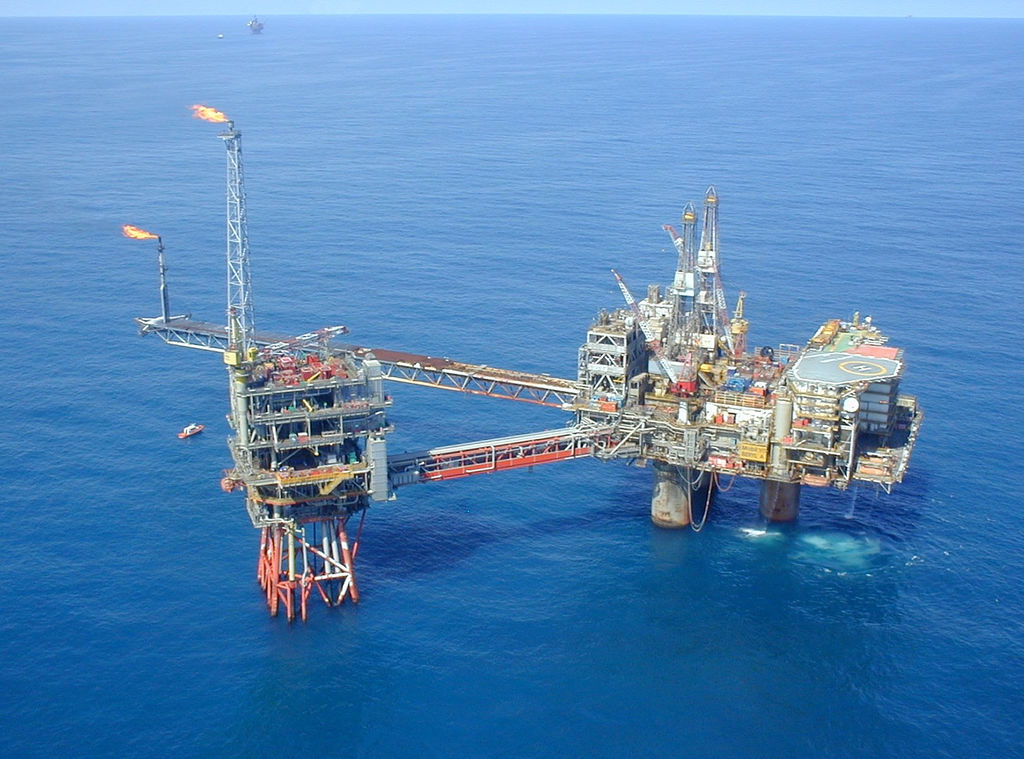
Beryl Alpha is a crude oil platform in the UK sector of the North Sea, 335km northeast of Aberdeen.

This sector includes the extraction of oil and gas. In 2024 it contributed £27.8 billion to GDP, which is a real-terms decline of 84% from the 1997 peak of £173.5 billion (adjusted for inflation). The estimated number of jobs in the industry was 55,000 in March 2026.

Oil and gas equivalent to 47.7 billion barrels were recovered from the UK continental shelf between the 1960s and 2024. The UK's proven reserves are equivalent to 2.9 billion barrels, although it is estimated that a further 10 to 20 billion barrels could still be recovered. After extraction peaked in 1999, the UK became a net importer of natural gas in 2004, and a net importer of oil in 2005. While Norway continues to license and develop new North Sea oil projects, maintaining output close to historic highs, the UK Government has chosen not to do so in order to help meet its self-imposed net-zero emissions targets. The UK is home to a number of large energy companies, including two of the six oil and gas "supermajors" – BP and Shell.

Roughly 107,000 tonnes of coal were produced in 2024, nearly all of which was extracted from five deep mines. This was a fraction of the 287 million tonnes produced in 1913, at the height of coal mining in the United Kingdom. Coal use has been phased out as electricity generation now favours gas, nuclear and renewables. The last coal-fired power plant, Ratcliffe-on-Soar, closed in September 2024. The UK is rich in a number of other natural resources, including tungsten, tin, limestone, iron ore, salt, clay, chalk, gypsum, lead and silica.

==== Utilities ====
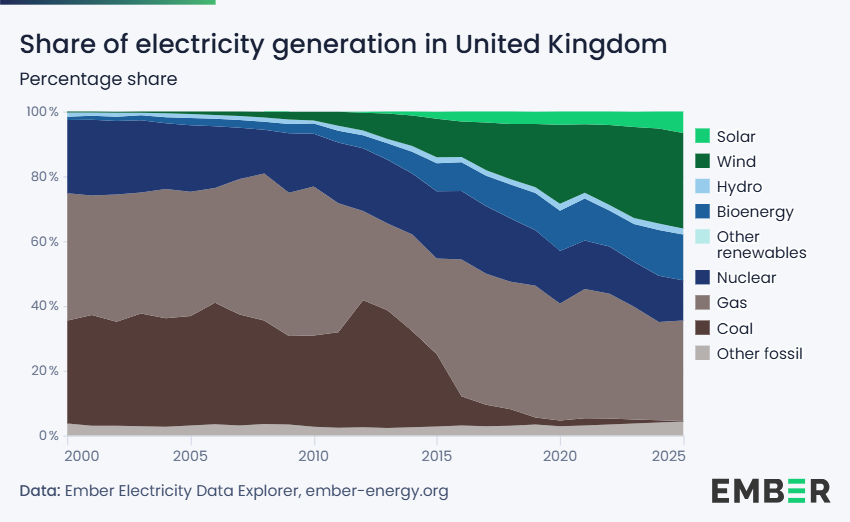
Electricity generation in the United Kingdom by source: percentage share, 2000–2025

This sector includes the supply of electricity, gas, steam, and air conditioning; and water supply, sewerage, waste management and remediation activities. It added gross value of £83.24 billion to the economy in 2024, with 391,000 jobs as of March 2026.

Owing to improved efficiency in domestic appliances, electricity consumption per household dropped by 26% between 2007 and 2023, from 4,662 kilowatt-hours (kWh) to 3,449kWh. UK natural gas consumption peaked in 2000 at 106.6 billion cubic metres (bcm) and has declined by 40% to 64.4 bcm in 2025. Manufacturing, the largest single consumer of energy, saw a 39% fall in energy usage between 1990 and 2018. The reduction in gas and electricity usage over the past quarter of a century corresponds with a real-terms fall in gross value added by utilities.

Public water supply and sanitation is characterised by universal access and generally good service quality. Unlike many other developed countries, the UK features diverse institutional arrangements across its constituent parts: England and Wales, Scotland, and Northern Ireland. In England and Wales, water services are mainly provided by private companies, while in Scotland and Northern Ireland, they are managed by state owned entities.

=== Service industries ===
The service sector is the dominant sector of the UK economy, and it accounted for 82% of GDP in 2023.

==== Arts, entertainment and recreation ====
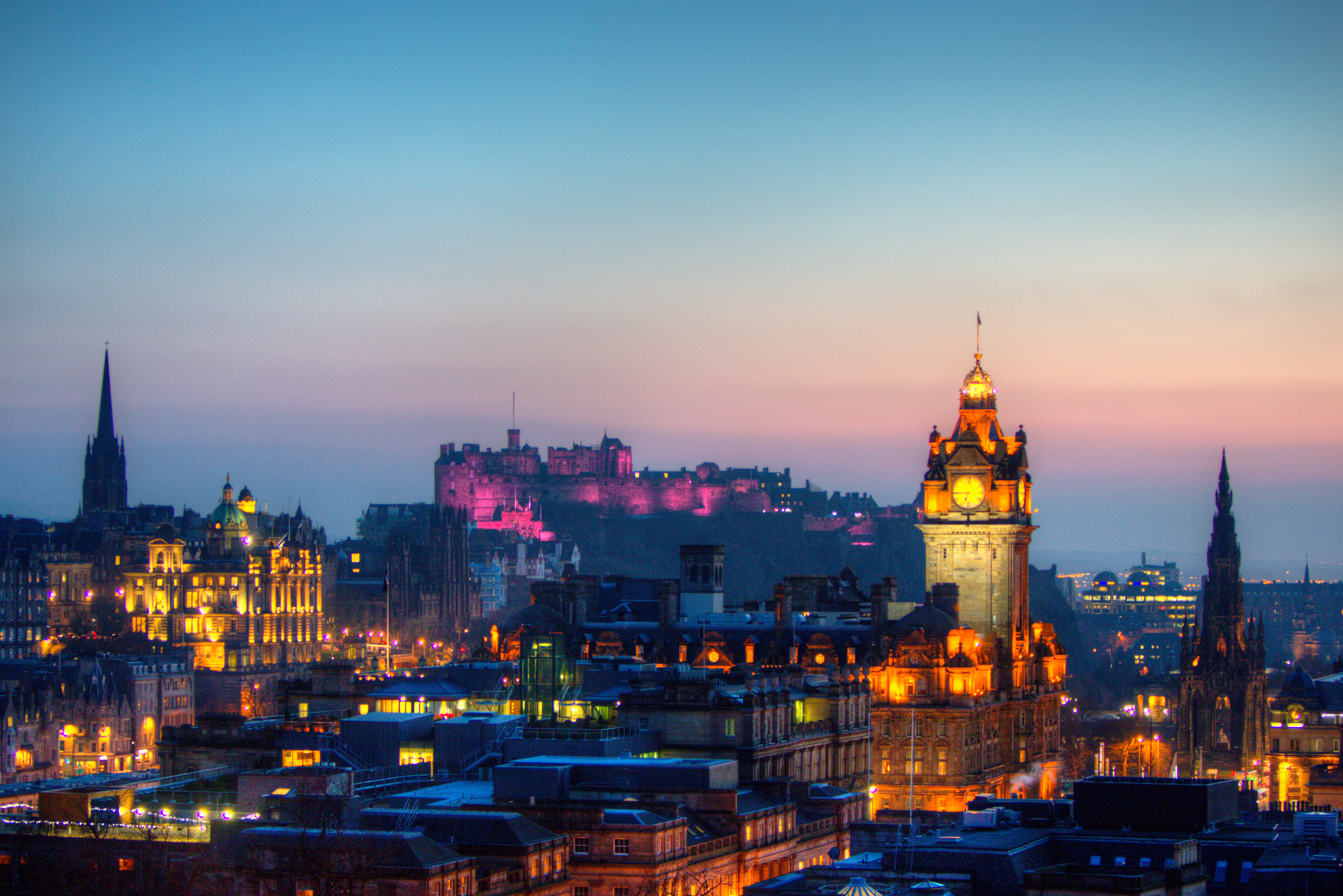
Edinburgh Castle (lit pink) is the third-most visited tourist attraction with an entry fee in the UK.

This includes libraries, museums, historical sites, concerts, live theatre, fairgrounds, gambling, sports facilities, and amusement parks.

The sector added £35.7 billion to UK GDP in 2024, and the number of jobs was estimated at 1.1 million in March 2026.

==== Education ====
All levels of public and private education added gross value of £151.4 billion to the UK economy in 2024, and there were an estimated 3.1 million jobs in March 2026.

For the 2021/22 academic year, it has been estimated that UK universities and other higher education (HE) institutions added gross value of £71 billion to the economy. In 2024/25 there were 2.86 million students in higher education, including 685,570 from overseas. The HE sector employed 407,175 staff in total. Operating expenditure amounted to £53.1 billion, of which £28.3 billion was funded by tuition fees and education contracts.

==== Finance and insurance activities ====
The UK financial services industry added gross value of £208.7 billion to the UK economy in 2024, and there were an estimated 1.1 million jobs in the sector as of March 2026. It is nearly 20% smaller than before the Great Recession. Adjusted for inflation, gross value added to GDP by financial services peaked at £251.2 billion in 2008.

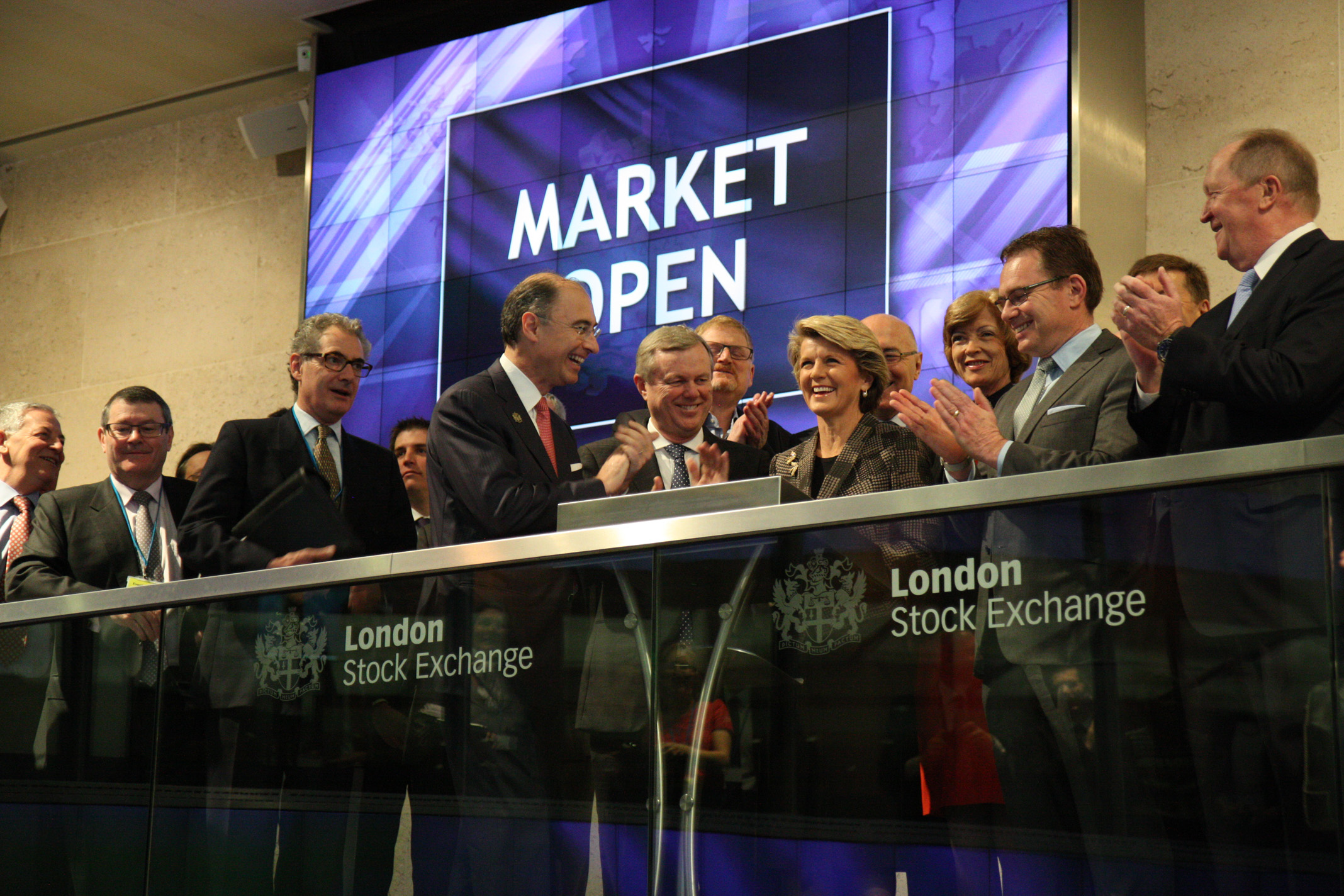
Market open of the London Stock Exchange on 10 March 2014

Output per job is almost triple the UK average, making the sector highly productive. It is a significant source of government tax receipts, contributing £79.3 billion to tax revenue in 2023, with employment taxes and corporation tax comprising the largest shares. Exports of financial services make a significant positive contribution towards the country's balance of payments. In 2025, exports amounted to £105.1 billion, while imports were worth £20.6 billion, netting a trade surplus of £84.4 billion.

Half of the UK finance sector's output is generated in London, which is a major financial centre for international business and a first-tier global city, alongside New York City. More than 500 banks have offices in London, and it is by far the largest trading marketplace for credit, foreign exchange, and interest rate derivatives, sometimes handling up to 50% of international contracts. Each day, around £2.1 trillion worth of foreign exchange transactions take place in London. Three international clearing houses are domiciled in the city: LCH, ICE Clear Europe, and LME Clear, together accounting for 33% of the global market.

London's financial services industry is primarily based in the historic City of London (known as The City) and Canary Wharf. The City houses the London Stock Exchange, the London Metal Exchange, and the Bank of England – the UK's central bank. Banks, insurers, and investment firms based there include Aviva, Investec, Legal & General, Lloyd's of London, Lloyds Banking Group, Metro Bank, Moody's, NatWest, Schroders, and Standard Chartered. Canary Wharf began development in the 1980s and is home to major financial institutions such as Barclays, BGC Group, BNY Mellon, Citigroup, Deutsche Bank, Fitch, HSBC (relocating to The City in 2027), JPMorgan Chase, Mastercard, Morgan Stanley, Revolut, and Visa (from 2028).

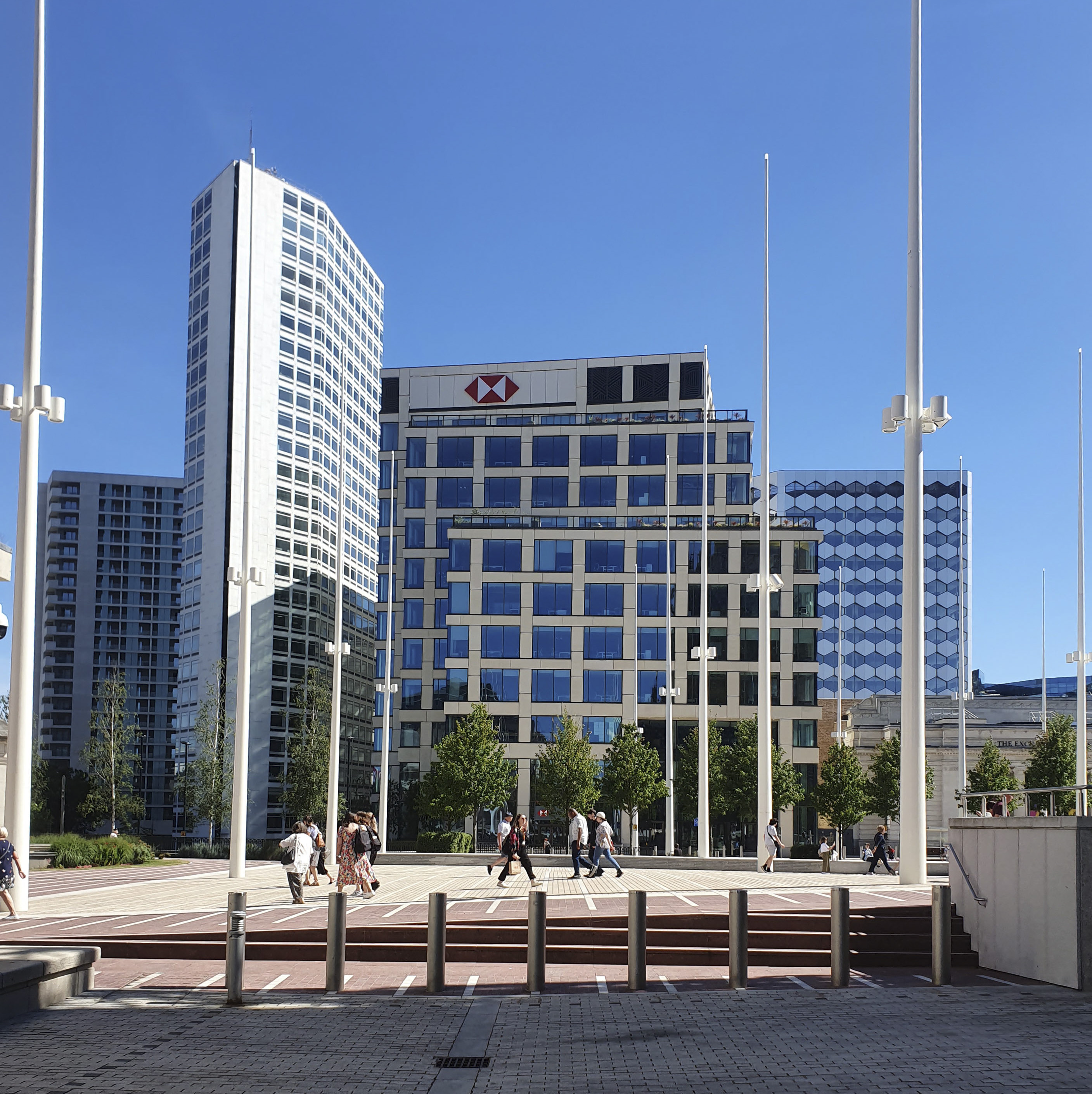
HSBC offices at One Centenary Square, Birmingham

Outside London there are a number of other financial hubs across the UK. Deutsche Bank, Goldman Sachs and HSBC have offices in the English city of Birmingham, where 22,125 people work in finance. Leeds houses the offices of more than 30 national and international banks, with 19,435 employed by the sector. In Scotland, Edinburgh is home to the headquarters of Aberdeen Group, NatWest Group (which includes Royal Bank of Scotland) and Standard Life, while Virgin Money has its European headquarters in Glasgow. In 2024, 40,790 people worked in finance in Edinburgh and 18,300 in Glasgow.

Assets owned by the UK financial system amounted to £28 trillion in 2024, of which £13.6 trillion was held by banks (including loans, mortgages, etc.), £2.3 trillion by insurance companies, £2.5 trillion by pension funds, £0.8 trillion by the Bank of England, and £8.6 trillion by other financial institutions.

Assets under management on behalf of clients were valued at £11.1 trillion in 2025, including £5.9 trillion owned by overseas customers, making the UK the world's second-largest investment hub after the United States.

==== Health and social work ====
Human health and social work activities added gross value of £222.6 billion to UK GDP in 2024, and the estimated number of jobs within the sector was 5.09 million as of March 2026.

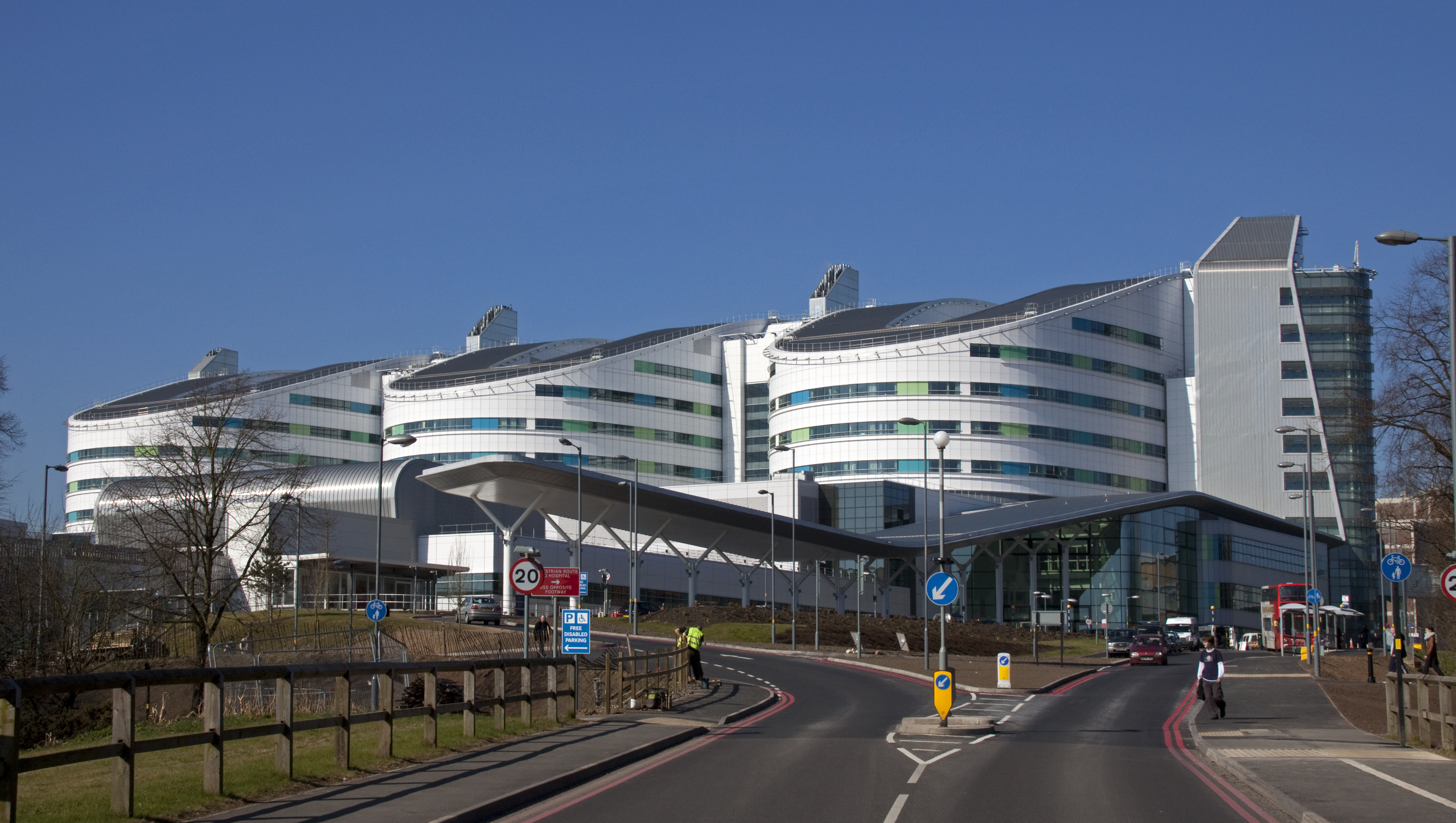
Queen Elizabeth Hospital Birmingham

In 2024, government healthcare spending was £269 billion (81% of total), while non-government spending was £63.1 billion (19%). Additionally, combined public and private net capital expenditure amounted to £16.8 billion, including £2.3 billion related to research and development.

In the UK the majority of the healthcare sector consists of the state funded and operated National Health Service (NHS). The NHS operates independently in each of the four constituent countries of the UK. NHS England is by far the largest of the four and had a budget of £182 billion in 2024. It also has a workforce of 1.8 million, making NHS England the largest single employer in Europe and putting it amongst the largest employers in the world.

==== Hospitality ====
Accommodation and food (and beverage) service activities, which includes bars, pubs, coffee shops, restaurants and takeaways, added gross value of £73.5 billion to the UK economy in 2024. There were an estimated 2.61 million hospitality jobs as of March 2026.

==== Information and communication ====
This wide-ranging classification includes the publishing of books, newspapers, magazines, journals and software; film and TV production; cinemas; music recording and distribution, broadcasting; telecommunications; computer programming, IT consultancy and related activities; and search engines, web hosting, and streaming services.

It contributed £161 billion to the UK economy in 2024, and the estimated number of jobs was 1.57 million at March 2026. Information and communication was the fastest growing sector in the UK from 1990 to 2024. Economic output rose by more than 1,600% in real terms, largely due to the rapid expansion of telecommunications, which saw growth of 37,900%.

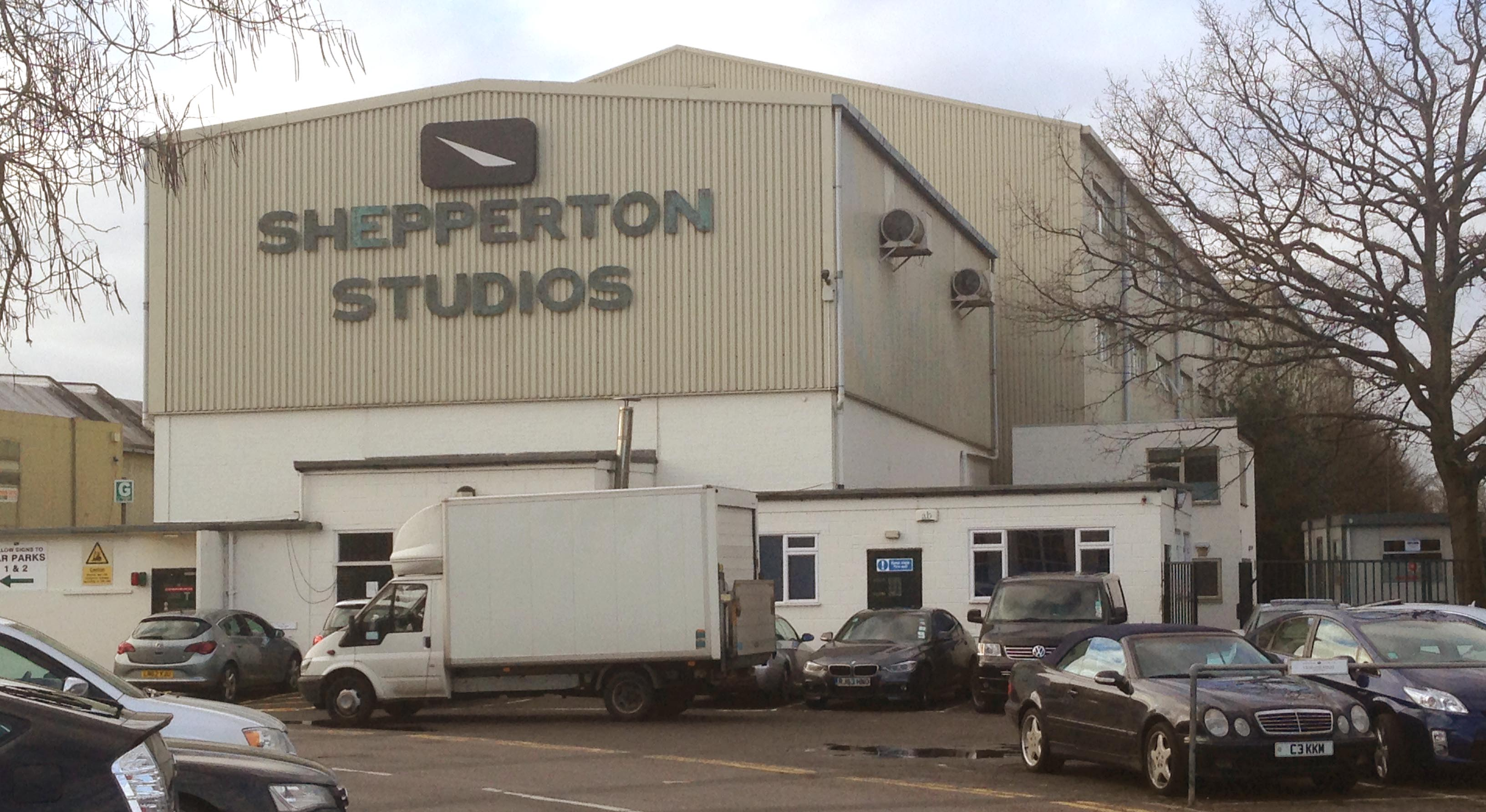
Shepperton Studios in Surrey is the second-largest film studio in the world, covering 1,500,000 square feet (140,000 m^{2}).

The UK is home to Europe's largest film and high-end television (HETV) industry. HETV is defined as a programme or series with a core expenditure per hour of at least £1 million. Tax relief introduced in 2007 and 2013 has helped drive industry growth. Consequently, the UK is now a global production hub, with inward foreign investment accounting for 85% of the £6.8 billion spent on creating films and HETV in the UK in 2025.

==== Professional, scientific and technical ====
This area includes legal services, accounting, management consultancy, architecture, engineering, scientific research and development, advertising, market research, and veterinary practice.

In 2024 the sector added gross value of £226 billion to UK GDP, with 3.5 million jobs estimated in March 2026.

==== Public administration, defence and social security ====
This refers to core government activities essential for the functioning and defence of a state (including where those activities are performed by private contractors), as well as the funding and administration of social security programmes.

In 2024 the sector added gross value of £131.5 billion to the economy, and there were an estimated 1.79 million jobs as of March 2026.

==== Real estate ====
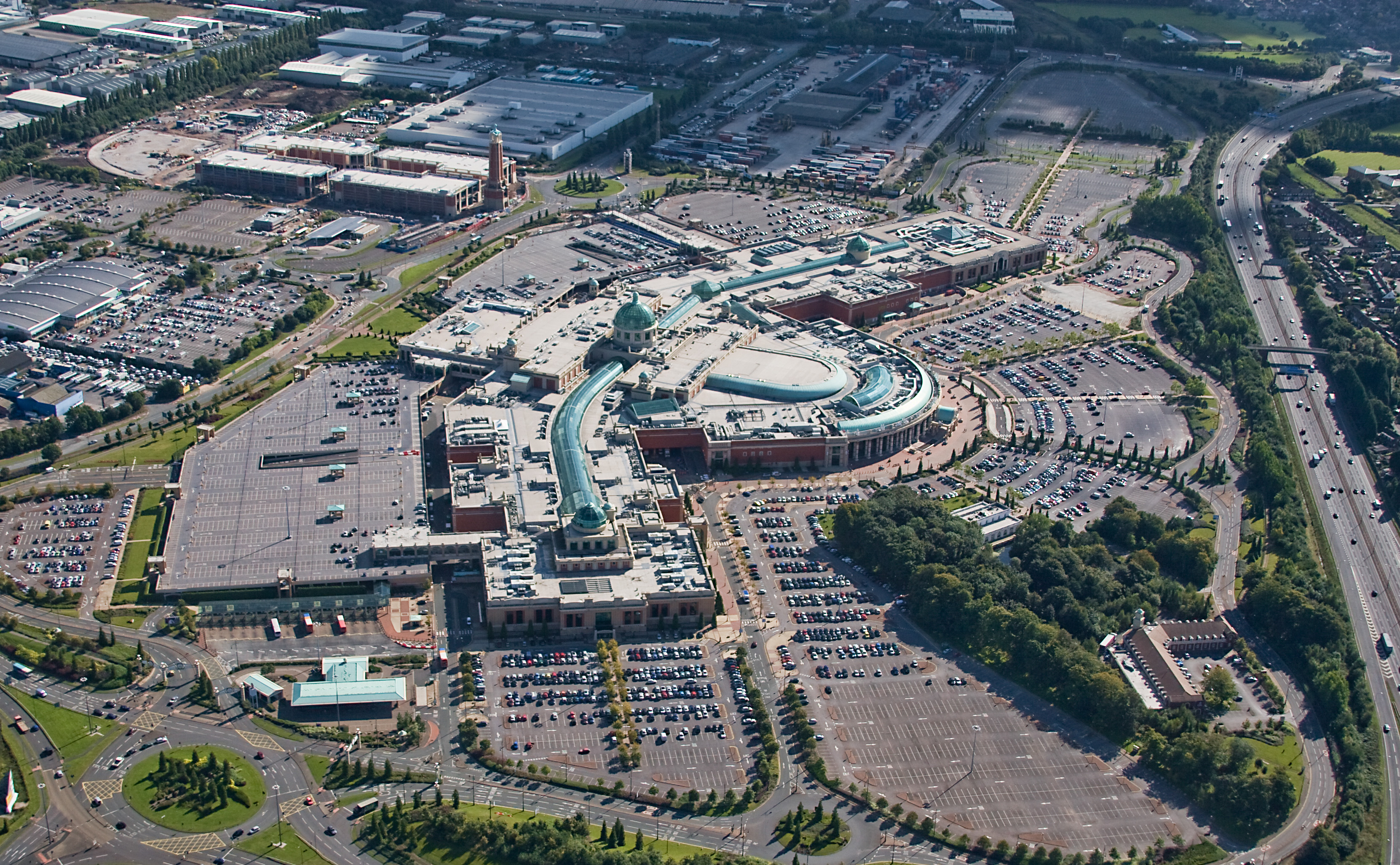
The Trafford Centre shopping complex in Manchester was sold for £1.6 billion in 2011 in the largest property sale in British history.

Real estate activities added gross value of £380 billion to UK GDP in 2024, most of which is derived from rent and imputed rent – an estimate of theoretical income that owner-occupiers would be paid if they rented their home to a tenant – which together comprise 14% of GDP. Rent has nearly doubled as a share of GDP since 1985 and now accounts for a greater share than manufacturing. The number of real estate jobs was estimated at 728,000 in March 2026.

Between 1997 and 2025, the median average house sales price in England increased by 400%, while median earnings increased by 132%. In 2025, the median average home in England, at £300,000, cost 7.6 times the median annual average earnings of a full-time employee (£39,300); in Wales, the average home (£213,000) was 6.0 times median annual average earnings (£35,800). Regionally, London had the highest affordability ratio, with average homes selling for 10.6 times average earnings. The North East of England had the lowest, at 5.0 times.

==== Transportation and storage ====
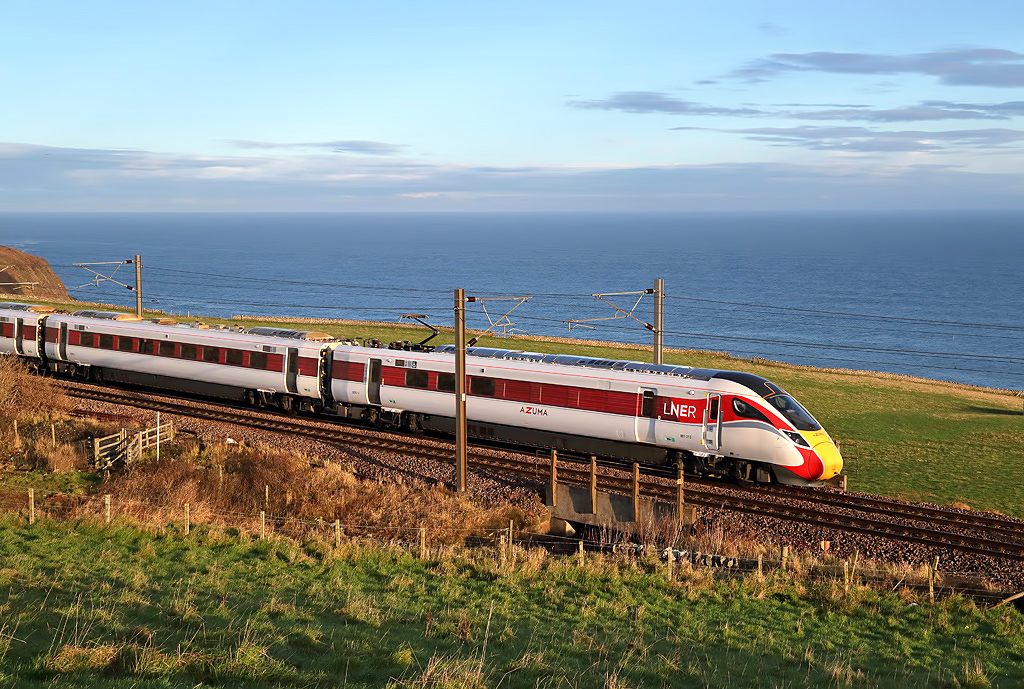
The East Coast Main Line is a 393-mile-long (632 km) railway line between London and Edinburgh.

This sector includes passenger and freight transport by land, water and air; warehousing; cargo handling; operation of airports, ports and harbours; operation of roads, bridges, tunnels and car parks; towing and roadside assistance; and postal and courier services.

Transportation and storage added gross value of £92.1 billion to the UK economy in 2024, and the estimated number of jobs within the industry was 1.91 million at March 2026.

The UK has a total road network of 246,700 miles (397,025 km) with 31,400 miles (50,533 km) of major roads, including 2,300 miles (3,701 km) of motorway. The railway infrastructure in Great Britain is owned by Network Rail which has 19,291 miles (31,046 km) of railway lines, of which 9,866 miles (15,878 km) is open for traffic. There are a further 206.5 miles (332.3 km) of track in Northern Ireland, owned and operated by Northern Ireland Railways.

National Highways is the government-owned company responsible for trunk roads and motorways in England apart from the privately owned and operated M6 Toll.

In 2025, 46 UK airports handled a total of 299.35 million passengers. In that year the three largest airports were London Heathrow Airport (84.4 million passengers), Gatwick Airport (42.7 million) and Manchester Airport (32.0 million). Heathrow, located 14 miles (23 km) west of Central London, once had the most international passenger traffic of any airport in the world until it was overtaken by Dubai International Airport in 2014. Heathrow is the primary hub for the UK flag carrier British Airways and the UK-based airline Virgin Atlantic, while easyJet is the main operator at Gatwick.

==== Wholesale and retail trade ====
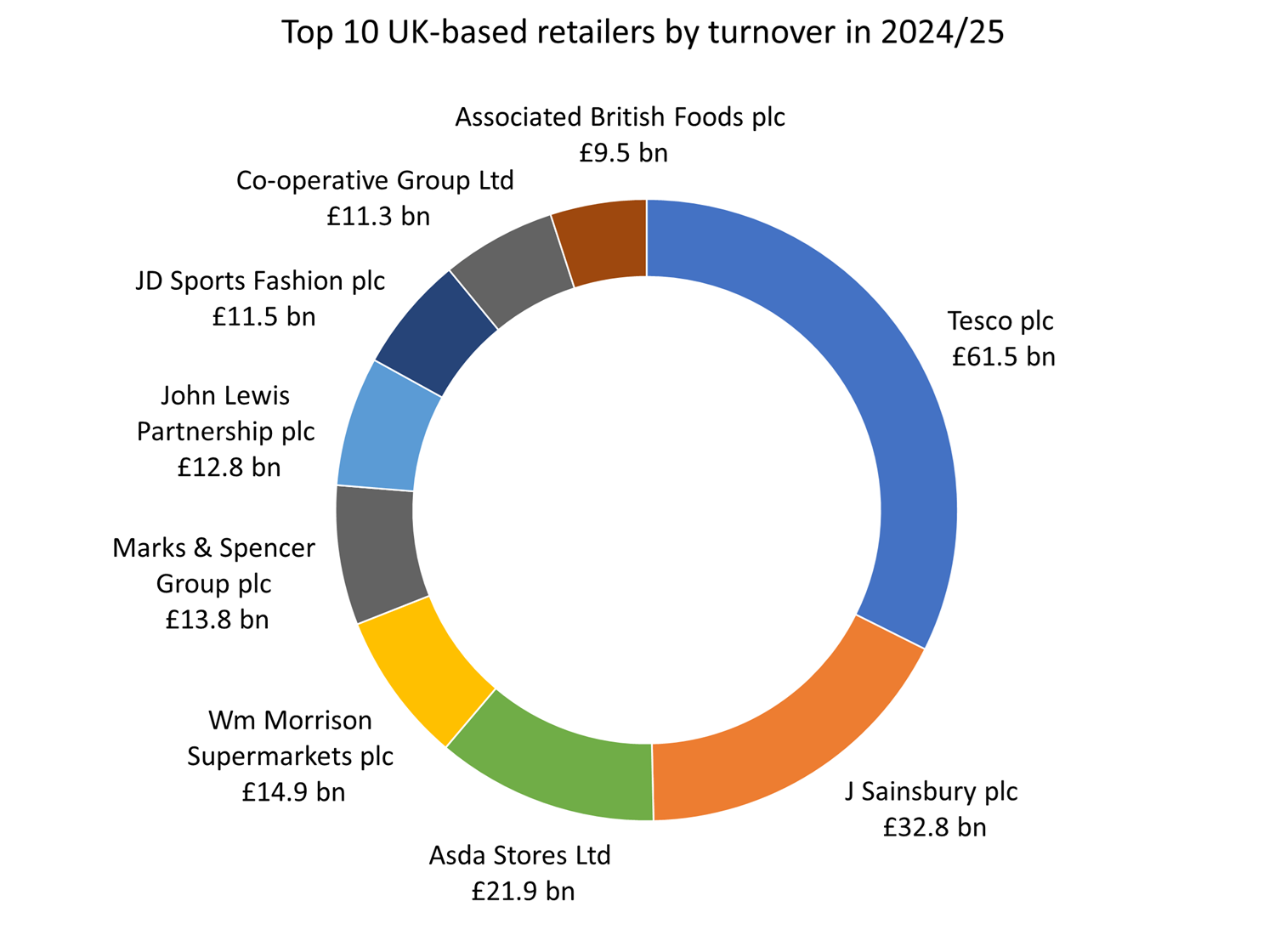
Top 10 UK-based retailers by turnover in 2024/25

In addition to the retail sale of food, beverages, tobacco, clothing, consumer electronics and household goods, this sector includes the motor trade, automotive repairs, the sale of automotive fuel, office furniture and equipment, and agricultural machinery and equipment.

It contributed gross value of £247.2 billion to the UK economy in 2024, and the sector provides an estimated 4.63 million jobs as of March 2026. At the 2021 census, 15% of the labour force in England and Wales were employed in the wholesale and retail trade.

In June 2026, online sales accounted for to 29.4% of retail spending in the UK.

The UK grocery market is dominated by six companies: Tesco (28.2% market share), Sainsbury's (15.2%), Asda (11.5%), Aldi (10.8%), Lidl (8.6%), and Morrisons (8.3%) in May 2026. Aldi, a discounter based in Germany, overtook Morrisons to become the UK's fourth-largest supermarket chain in September 2022, while rival German discounter Lidl became the fifth-largest in May 2026.

UK-based Tesco, with a retail turnover of US$85.2 billion in 2023, was Europe's fifth-largest retailer after Schwarz Group ($177bn), Aldi ($123.6bn), Ahold Delhaize ($97.8bn), and Carrefour ($90.8bn). International stores account for an unusually small proportion of UK-based retailers' turnover at 14.8%, compared to the European average of 43.4%.

== Currency ==
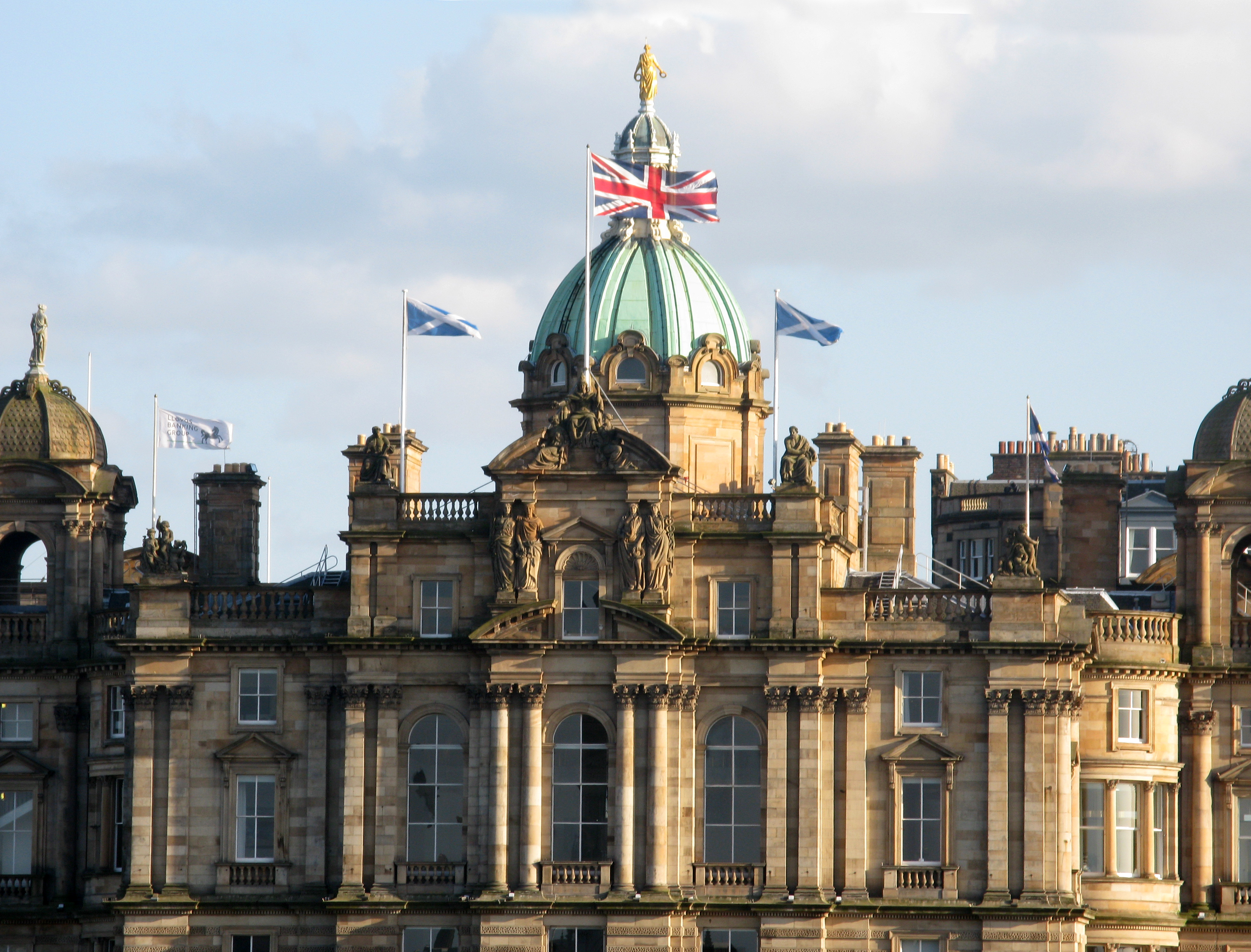
The Bank of Scotland was the first bank in Europe to successfully print its own banknotes.

Sterling is the currency of the United Kingdom, with its main unit, the pound, represented by the symbol '£'. The Bank of England is the central bank of the UK, responsible for issuing currency. Banks in Scotland and Northern Ireland retain the right to issue their own notes, subject to retaining enough Bank of England notes in reserve to cover the issuance.

Sterling is used as a reserve currency by other countries. In 2025, official foreign exchange reserves held the equivalent of US$579 billion in sterling, making it the fourth-largest holding after the US dollar ($7.4 trillion), euro ($2.6 trillion), and Japanese yen ($768 billion), which overtook sterling in 2017.

The UK chose not to join the euro at the currency's launch in 1999. The government of the day pledged to hold a referendum in the future to decide on membership should "five economic tests" be met. In 2007 the new Prime Minister, Gordon Brown, weighed up holding a referendum based on those tests. Brown concluded that while the decision was close, the United Kingdom should not yet have a referendum on adopting the euro. He ruled out membership for the foreseeable future, saying that the decision not to join had been right for the UK and for Europe. In particular, he cited fluctuations in house prices as a barrier to immediate entry. Public opinion polls have consistently shown that a majority of British voters were opposed to joining the single currency. The possibility of joining the euro has become a non-issue since the UK left the EU in 2020.

=== Exchange rates ===
Average for each year, in US dollars and euros per pound; and inversely: £ per US$ and € (Synthetic Euro XEU before 1999). These averages conceal wide intra-year spreads. The coefficient of variation gives an indication of this. It also shows the extent to which the pound tracks the euro or the dollar. Note the effect of Black Wednesday in late 1992 by comparing the averages for 1992 and for 1993.

Year	£/US$	US$/£	C.var	£/XEU	XEU/£	C.var
1990	£0.5633	$1.775		£0.7161	₠1.397	
1991	£0.5675	$1.762		£0.7022	₠1.424	
1992	£0.5699	$1.755		£0.7365	₠1.358	
1993	£0.6663	$1.501		£0.7795	₠1.283	
1994	£0.6536	$1.53		£0.7742	₠1.292	
1995	£0.6338	$1.578		£0.82	₠1.22	
1996	£0.6411	$1.56		£0.8029	₠1.245	
1997	£0.6106	$1.638		£0.6909	₠1.447	
1998	£0.6037	$1.656		£0.6779	₠1.475	
1999	£0.6185	$1.617		£0.6595	€1.516	
2000	£0.6609	$1.513		£0.6099	€1.64	
2001	£0.6943	$1.44		£0.6223	€1.607	
2002	£0.6664	$1.501		£0.6289	€1.59	
2003	£0.6123	$1.633		£0.6924	€1.444	
2004	£0.5461	$1.832	2.26%	£0.6787	€1.474	1.92%

Year	£/US$	US$/£	C.var	£/€	€/£	C.var
2005	£0.55	$1.82	3.47%	£0.6842	€1.462	1.27%
2006	£0.5435	$1.842	3.79%	£0.6821	€1.466	1.11%
2007	£0.4999	$2.001	1.97%	£0.6848	€1.461	2.4%
2008	£0.5499	$1.835		£0.7964	€1.226	
2009	£0.641	$1.566		£0.8914	€1.123	
2010	£0.6474	$1.546	1.27%	£0.8586	€1.166	3.83%
2011	£0.6231	$1.605	3.81%	£0.8684	€1.151	1.286%
2012	£0.6310	$1.585	2.74%	£0.8112	€1.233	0.712%
2013	£0.6650	$1.503	5.17%	£0.8496	€1.177	4.54%
2014	£0.6320	$1.582	5.25%	£0.8060	€1.240	5.35%
2015	£0.6810	$1.468	7.20%	£0.7262	€1.377	11.04%
2016	£0.770	$1.299		£0.8193	€1.2242	
2017	£0.808	$1.238		£0.8766	€1.1414	
2018	£0.750	$1.333		£0.885	€1.1301	
2019	£0.748	$1.337		£0.8773	€1.1405	

For consistency and comparison purposes, coefficient of variation is measured on both the "per £" ratios, although it is conventional to show the forex rates as dollars per £ and £ per euro.

== Economic variation within the United Kingdom ==
=== Gross domestic product (2022) ===
Within the United Kingdom, England has the largest constituent economy measured by gross domestic product (GDP) according to the figures provided by the Office for National Statistics (ONS) for the year 2022, whilst Northern Ireland has the smallest, which is also in line with their respective population sizes. England also has the highest level of GDP per capita within the UK, whilst Wales has the lowest.

Rank	Nation	Population	GDP (in millions of GBP)	GDP (in millions of USD)	Share of the UK total	GDP per capita (GBP)	GDP per capita (USD)
1	England	57 106 398	2 161 593	2 664 325	86.25%	37 852	46 655
2	Scotland	5 447 698	186 851	230 445	7.46%	34 299	42 301
3	Wales	3 131 640	85 412	105 337	3.41%	27 274	33 636
4	Northern Ireland	1 910 543	56 694	69 813	2.26%	29 674	36 541
United Kingdom (total)		67 596 279	2 506 170	3 089 072	100%	37 076	45 758

==== By English region ====
England constitutes the vast majority of the total UK population (84.3%) and an even larger proportion of the GDP (86.25%). Therefore, a large part of the regional variation in the UK economy occurs within England itself. London, which is the capital of both the UK and England, has the largest regional economy in England as well as the highest GDP per capita, whilst North East England has both the smallest economy out of the regions as measured by total nominal GDP, as well as the lowest GDP per capita in England.

Below is a list of the Regions of England by GDP and GDP per capita, also provided by the ONS for the year 2022.

Rank	Region	Population	GDP (in millions of GBP)	GDP (in millions of USD)	Share of the UK total	GDP per capita (GBP)	GDP per capita (USD)
1	London	8 866 180	562 179	693 096	22.43%	63 407	78 154
2	South East England	9 379 833	374 453	461 665	14.94%	39 921	49 208
3	North West England	7 516 113	247 199	304 755	9.86%	32 889	40 538
4	East of England	6 398 497	213 828	263 556	8.53%	33 419	41 191
5	South West England	5 764 881	194 030	239 186	7.74%	33 657	41 485
6	West Midlands	6 021 653	181 354	223 599	7.23%	30 117	37 118
7	Yorkshire and the Humber	5 541 262	170 304	209 933	6.79%	30 734	37 888
8	East Midlands	4 934 939	146 482	180 663	5.84%	29 683	36 610
9	North East England	2 683 040	71 763	88 526	2.86%	26 747	33 000
England		57 106 398	2 161 593	2 664 325	86.25%	37 852	46 655
United Kingdom (total)		67 596 279	2 506 170	3 089 072	100%	37 076	45 758

=== Gross value added (2020) ===
Excluding the effects of North Sea oil and gas (which is classified in official statistics as extra-regio), England has the highest gross value added (GVA) and Wales the lowest of the UK's countries.

Rank	Country	GVA per head, 2020
1	England	£32,866 ($42136)
2	Scotland	£29,629 ($37986)
3	Northern Ireland	£25,575 ($32788)
4	Wales	£23,882 ($30618)

==== By English region ====
Within England, GVA per capita is highest in London. The following table shows the GVA per capita of the nine statistical regions of England.

Rank	Region	GVA per head, 2020
1	London	£55,974 ($71762)
2	South East England	£34,516 ($44251)
3	East of England	£29,176 ($37405)
4	North West England	£28,257 ($36227)
5	South West England	£28,012 ($35913)
6	West Midlands	£26,281 ($33694)
7	East Midlands	£25,956 ($33277)
8	Yorkshire and the Humber	£25,696 ($32944)
9	North East England	£23,109 ($29627)

== International trade ==
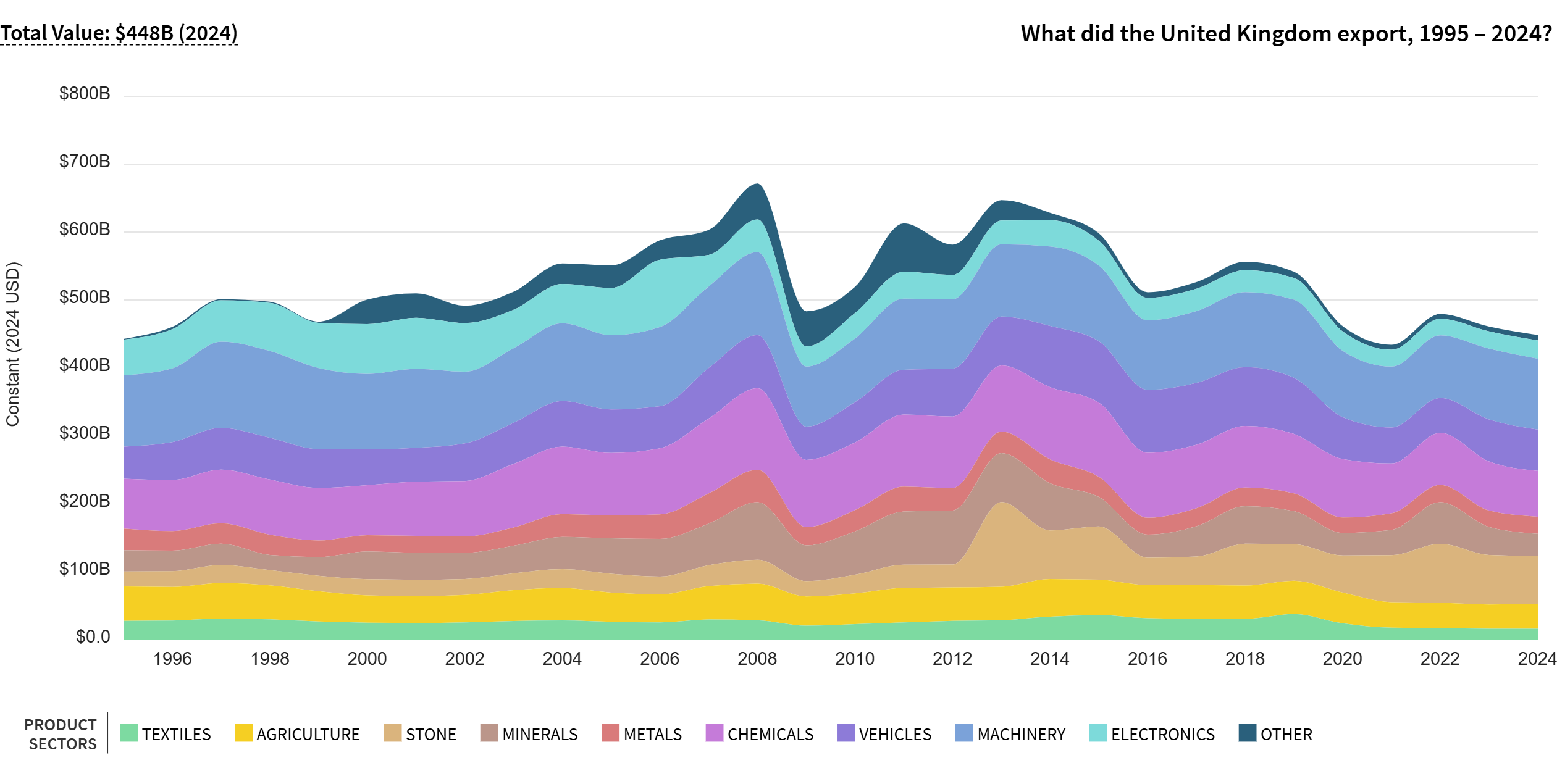
Value in US$ of UK goods exports at constant prices from 1995 to 2024. Note: precious metals such as gold are included in the stone category.

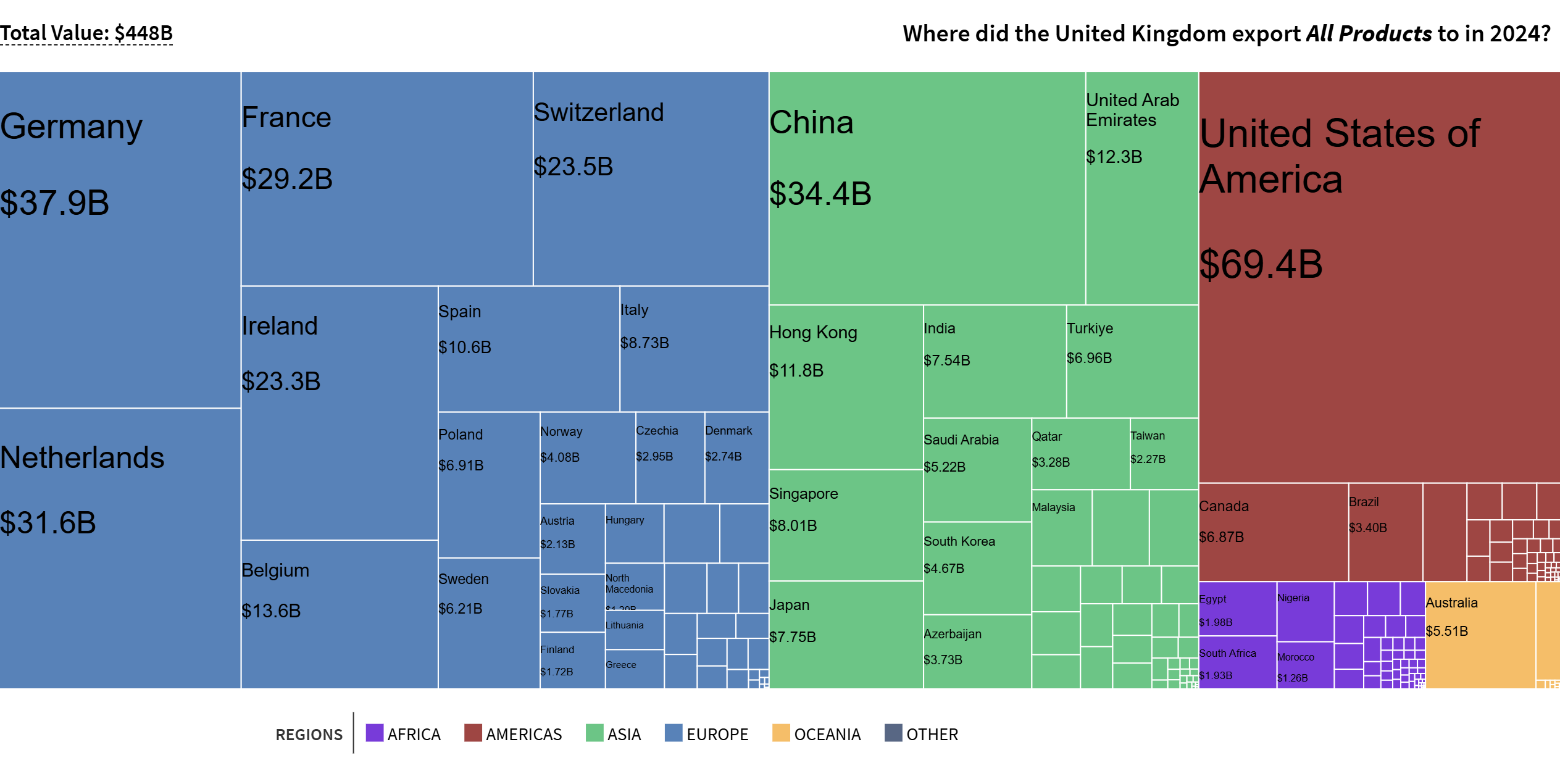
A tree map of the UK's main export partners for goods in 2024

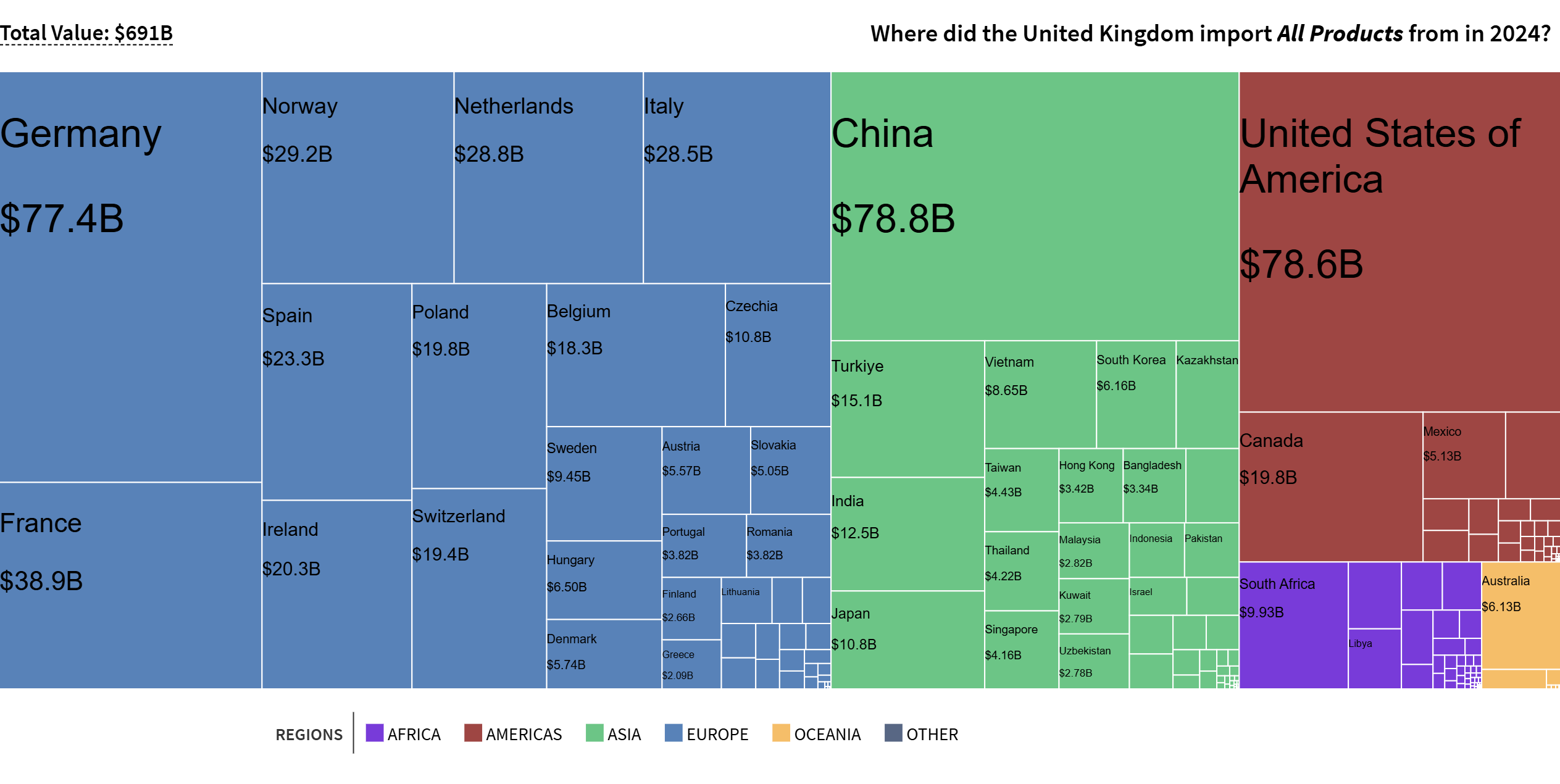
A tree map of the UK's main import partners for goods in 2024

The trade deficit (goods and services) narrowed £0.2 billion to £7.9 billion in the three months to November 2018 as both goods and services exports each increased £0.1 billion more than their respective imports.

Excluding erratic commodities (mainly aircraft) the total trade deficit widened £1.2 billion to £9.5 billion in the three months to November 2018.

Large increases in export prices of oil and aircraft drove the narrowing of the total trade deficit; removing the effect of inflation, the total trade deficit widened £0.3 billion to £6.5 billion in the three months to November 2018.

The trade in goods deficit widened £0.8 billion with EU countries and narrowed £0.9 billion with non-EU countries in the three months to November 2018, due mainly to increases in imports from EU countries and exports to non-EU countries.

The total trade deficit widened £4.1 billion in the 12 months to November 2018 due mainly to a £4.4 billion narrowing in the trade in services surplus.

Following the withdrawal of the United Kingdom from the European Union, the negotiation of a trade deal between the UK and the European Union including her 27 member states might have the same status than third countries for statistics related to imports and exports with the UK:

- According to OEC World 2017 data, the EU-27-2020 could become/stay one of the notable partners of the UK, with exports from the UK reaching near $200B, close from the United States ($45B, and China $21B).
- According to OEC World 2017 data, the EU-27-2020 could become/stay one of the notable partners of the UK, with imports to the UK reaching near $330B, close from the United States ($46B, and China $58B).

Trade deals in force

- Free trade agreements of the United Kingdom

Trade deals being negotiated

- Canada–United Kingdom Free Trade Agreement
- India–United Kingdom Free Trade Agreement
- Gulf Cooperation Council–United Kingdom Free Trade Agreement
- United Kingdom–United States Free Trade Agreement
- Comprehensive and Progressive Agreement for Trans-Pacific Partnership
- Accession of the United Kingdom to CPTPP

== Investment ==
In 2013 the UK was the leading country in Europe for inward foreign direct investment (FDI) with $26.51bn. This gave it a 19.31% market share in Europe. In contrast, the UK was second in Europe for outward FDI, with $42.59bn, giving a 17.24% share of the European market.

In October 2017, the ONS revised the UK's balance of payments, changing the net international investment position from a surplus of £469bn to a deficit of £22bn. Deeper analysis of outward investment revealed that much of what was thought to be foreign debt securities owned by British companies were actually loans to British citizens. Inward investment also dropped, from a surplus of £120bn in the first half of 2016 to a deficit of £25bn in the same period of 2017. The UK had been relying on a surplus of inward investment to make up for its long-term current account deficit. In April 2021, Lord Grimstone established the UK Investment Council to enhance UK inward investment and inform the trade policy of the UK by providing a forum for global investors to offer high-level advice to the government.

According to the Office for National Statistics, the UK is the biggest investor in the United States.

The UK attracts foreign direct investment (FDI) from a number of countries, including some of the world's leading startup ecosystems, such as Silicon Valley and New York (United States), Beijing (China), Toronto (Canada) and Tel Aviv (Israel). In 2024–2025, inward investment resulted in 14,213 jobs created in the UK from the United States, 1,661 from China, 1,701 from Canada and 871 from Israel.

== Mergers and acquisitions ==
Since 1985, more than 103,430 deals with UK participation have been announced. There have been four major waves of increased M&A activity: 1999–2000, 2007, 2018–2021, and 2026. The year with the highest cumulated value of deals (£505.39bn) was 2021.

The first half of 2026 saw mergers and acquisitions involving British companies amount to £218 billion—much higher than average, and the largest wave since 2007. Deals included Shell's $16.4bn acquisition of the Canadian oil and gas producer ARC Resources, GSK's $10.6bn acquisition of the US cancer biotech firm Nuvalent, and the US food-maker Ingredion's $2.7bn takeover of Tate & Lyle.

Here is a list of the top 10 deals including UK companies. The Vodafone–Mannesmann deal is still the biggest deal in global history.

Rank	Year	Acquirer	Acquirer nation	Target	Target nation	Value (£ billions)
1	1999	Vodafone AirTouch PLC	United Kingdom	Mannesmann AG	Germany	127
2	2015	Anheuser-Busch Inbev SA/NV	Belgium	SABMiller PLC	United Kingdom	71.2
3	2015	Royal Dutch Shell PLC	Netherlands	BG Group PLC	United Kingdom	46.7
4	2000	Glaxo Wellcome PLC	United Kingdom	SmithKline Beecham PLC	United Kingdom	46.5
5	2004	Royal Dutch Petroleum Co.	Netherlands	Shell Transport & Trading Co.	United Kingdom	40.8
6	2016	British American Tobacco PLC	United Kingdom	Reynolds American Inc.	United States	40.1
7	1999	Vodafone Group PLC	United Kingdom	AirTouch Communications Inc.	United States	36.3
8	2000	France Telecom SA	France	Orange PLC	United Kingdom	31.1
9	1998	British Petroleum Co PLC	United Kingdom	Amoco Corp.	United States	29.51
10	2016	GE Oil & Gas	United Kingdom	Baker Hughes Inc.	United States	26.63

== European Union membership ==
The proportion of the country's exports going to the EU has fallen from 54 per cent to 47 per cent over the past decade. The total value of exports however, has increased in the same period from £130 billion (€160 billion) to £240 billion (€275 billion).

In June 2016 the UK voted to leave the EU in a national referendum on its membership of the EU. After the activation of Article 50 of the Lisbon Treaty, the UK had been set to leave on Friday 29 March 2019. However the leave date was extended to Friday 12 April 2019 and then extended again to Thursday 31 October 2019, and then extended again until Friday 31 January 2020 with the ability to exit earlier. The future relationship between the UK and EU was under negotiation until the end of October 2019. UK economic growth slowed during 2019, with uncertainty over Brexit and a world economic slowdown blamed.

The UK left the EU in January 2020. On 16 July 2020, the government of UK affirmed that businesses across the United Kingdom, after the transition period ends, will continue to enjoy internal trade and jobs would remain protected against uncertain environment. From 1 January 2021, the powers which were previously exercised at an EU level in at least 70 policy areas were to directly transfer to the devolved administrations in Edinburgh, Cardiff and Belfast for the first time.

== Income, welfare and poverty ==
The United Kingdom is a developed country with social welfare infrastructure. In the year to March 2024:

- Median equivalised household income in the UK before taxes and benefits was £38,900, increasing to £41,900 after taxes and benefits.
- The richest fifth of people's mean equivalised household income before taxes and benefits (£116,600) was 12.2 times larger than the poorest fifth (£9,600), falling to 3.3 times (£85,100 and £25,700, respectively) after all taxes and benefits.
- Original income inequality (before taxes and benefits) was 47.6% as measured by the Gini coefficient, and reduced to 26.8% for final income inequality (after taxes and benefits), highlighting the redistributive effect of taxes and benefits.
- The proportion of people living in households receiving more in benefits (cash benefits and benefits in kind), than they paid in taxes (direct and indirect) was 53.3%; this remained relatively stable over the previous three years.

The poverty line in the UK is commonly defined as being 60% of the median disposable household income. In the year to March 2025, 10.9 million or around 16% of people in the UK were in relative poverty before housing costs, rising to 13.4 million or 20% when accounting for housing costs. This included 3.0 million children (21%) before housing costs and 4.0 million (27%) after housing costs.

== Economic impacts of climate change ==
According to the Government, the number of households in flood risk will be up to 970,000 homes in the 2020s, up from around 370,000 in January 2012. The effects of flooding and managing flood risk cost the country about £2.2bn a year, compared with the less than £1bn spent on flood protection and management. UK agriculture is also being affected by drought and weather changes.

In 2020 PricewaterhouseCoopers estimated that Storm Dennis damage to homes, businesses and cars could be between £175m and £225m and Storm Ciara cost up to £200m. Friends of the Earth criticised British government of the intended cuts to flood defence spending. The protection against increasing flood risk as a result of climate change requires rising investment. In 2009, the Environment Agency calculated that the UK needs to be spending £20m more compared to 2010 to 2011 as the baseline, each and every year out to 2035, just to keep pace with climate change.

The British government and the economist Nicholas Stern published the Stern Review on the Economics of Climate Change in 2006. The report states that climate change is the greatest and widest-ranging market failure ever seen, presenting a unique challenge for economics. The Review provides prescriptions including environmental taxes to minimise economic and social disruptions. The Stern Review's main conclusion is that the benefits of strong, early action on climate change far outweigh the costs of not acting. The Review points to the potential effects of climate change on water resources, food production, health, and the environment. According to the Review, without action, the overall costs of climate change will be equivalent to losing at least 5% of global gross domestic product (GDP) each year, now and forever. Including a wider range of risks and costs could increase this to 20% of GDP or more. The review leads to a simple conclusion: the benefits of strong, early action considerably outweigh the costs.

Climate change made the unusual rainfall in autumn and winter 2023–2024, 10 times more probable and 20% stronger. The rainfall led to "severe damage to homes and infrastructure, power blackouts, travel cancellations, and heavy losses of crops and livestock". The damage to arable crops alone is £1.2 billion, without counting vegetables. Claims for house insurance from weather related disasters increased by more than a third. Policies to address climate change can also reduce poverty according to some experts.

== Data ==
The following table shows the main economic indicators in 1980–2025. Inflation below 5% is in green.

Year	GDP (in Int'l$ PPP, ICP benchmarks 2017–2021)	GDP per capita (in Int'l$ PPP, ICP benchmarks 2017–2021)	GDP (current prices, in bn. US$ nominal)	GDP per capita (current prices, in US$ nominal)	GDP growth (constant prices, % change)	Inflation rate (year average, % change)	Unemployment (in %)	Government debt (gross, in % of GDP)
1980	529.3	9,396	604.7	10,734	▼-2.0%	▲16.8%	7.1%	42.5%
1981	▲576.2	▲10,223	▼589.1	▼10,453	▼-0.6%	▼12.2%	▲9.7%	▲44.7%
1982	▲623.9	▲11,084	▼560.1	▼9,950	▲2.0%	▼8.5%	▲10.7%	▼42.9%
1983	▲675.5	▲11,995	▼533.8	▼9,478	▲4.2%	▼5.2%	▲11.5%	▼41.8%
1984	▲715.6	▲12,685	▼505.9	▼8,968	▲2.2%	▼4.4%	▲11.8%	▲42.1%
1985	▲768.5	▲13,588	▲538.3	▲9,518	▲4.1%	▲5.2%	▼11.4%	▼41.2%
1986	▲808.3	▲14,261	▲656.4	▲11,581	▲3.1%	▼3.6%	▼11.3%	41.2%
1987	▲873.6	▲15,379	▲816.1	▲14,367	▲5.5%	▲4.1%	▼10.4%	▼39.2%
1988	▲953.4	▲16,751	▲992.5	▲17,439	▲5.4%	▲4.6%	▼8.6%	▼37%
1989	▲1,014.8	▲17,779	▲1,010.8	▲17,710	▲2.4%	▲5.2%	▼7.2%	▼32.4%
1990	▲1,058.8	▲18,497	▲1,200.9	▲20,981	▲0.6%	▲7.0%	▼7.1%	▼28.4%
1991	▲1,079.2	▲18,788	▲1,252.5	▲21,806	▼-1.4%	▲7.5%	▲8.9%	28.4%
1992	▲1,106.8	▲19,221	▲1,293.7	▲22,466	▲0.3%	▼4.2%	▲10.0%	▲33.1%
1993	▲1,158.8	▲20,079	▼1,159.0	▼20,081	▲2.3%	▼2.5%	▲10.4%	▲37.8%
1994	▲1,224.0	▲21,154	▲1,245.9	▲21,532	▲3.4%	▼2.0%	▼9.5%	▲40.6%
1995	▲1,279.7	▲22,055	▲1,349.4	▲23,255	▲2.4%	▲2.6%	▼8.6%	▲43.5%
1996	▲1,337.3	▲22,991	▲1,426.7	▲24,530	▲2.6%	▼2.4%	▼8.1%	43.5%
1997	▲1,426.7	▲24,466	▲1,569.6	▲26,917	▲4.9%	▼1.8%	▼7.0%	▲43.9%
1998	▲1,489.6	▲25,474	▲1,661.0	▲28,405	▲3.2%	▼1.6%	▼6.3%	▼41.8%
1999	▲1,555.1	▲26,500	▲1,693.9	▲28,864	▲2.9%	▼1.3%	▼6.0%	▼40.3%
2000	▲1,662.3	▲28,229	▼1,674.8	▼28,441	▲4.5%	▼0.8%	▼5.5%	▼37.5%
2001	▲1,740.4	▲29,441	▼1,656.6	▼28,024	▲2.4%	▲1.2%	▼5.1%	▼34.8%
2002	▲1,797.6	▲30,280	▲1,793.4	▲30,209	▲1.7%	▲1.3%	▲5.2%	▲35.3%
2003	▲1,892.1	▲31,727	▲2,063.1	▲34,594	▲3.2%	▲1.4%	▼5.0%	▲36.6%
2004	▲1,988.2	▲33,164	▲2,430.9	▲40,548	▲2.3%	▼1.3%	▼4.8%	▲39.7%
2005	▲2,107.8	▲34,889	▲2,554.2	▲42,279	▲2.8%	▲2.1%	4.8%	▲40.9%
2006	▲2,220.3	▲36,502	▲2,723.4	▲44,773	▲2.2%	▼2.3%	▲5.4%	▲41.9%
2007	▲2,347.3	▲38,281	▲3,105.9	▲50,651	▲2.9%	2.3%	5.4%	▲43.0%
2008	▲2,391.4	▲38,680	▼2,976.4	▼48,143	▲0.0%	▲3.6%	▲5.7%	▲50.6%
2009	▼2,295.7	▼36,873	▼2,438.1	▼39,159	▼-4.6%	▼2.2%	▲7.6%	▲64.5%
2010	▲2,376.2	▲37,861	▲2,499.2	▲39,821	▲2.3%	▲3.3%	▲7.9%	▲75.5%
2011	▲2,445.8	▲38,648	▲2,676.5	▲42,293	▲0.9%	▲4.5%	▲8.1%	▲81.1%
2012	▲2,529.5	▲39,702	▲2,720.2	▲42,696	▲1.5%	▼2.8%	▼8.0%	▲84.1%
2013	▲2,616.7	▲40,798	▲2,798.7	▲43,636	▲1.7%	▼2.6%	▼7.6%	▲84.9%
2014	▲2,746.4	▲42,502	▲3,087.0	▲47,772	▲3.2%	▼1.5%	▼6.2%	▲86.5%
2015	▲2,831.2	▲43,499	▼2,946.2	▼45,266	▲2.1%	▼0.0%	▼5.4%	▲87.3%
2016	▲2,921.2	▲44,527	▼2,716.9	▼41,412	▲2.2%	▲0.7%	▼4.9%	87.3%
2017	▲3,063.4	▲46,441	▼2,701.4	▼40,952	▲3.0%	▲2.7%	▼4.4%	▼86.1%
2018	▲3,157.6	▲47,636	▲2,900.7	▲43,760	▲1.6%	▼2.5%	▼4.1%	▼85.6%
2019	▲3,364.3	▲50,494	▼2,877.4	▼43,186	▲1.3%	▼1.8%	▼3.8%	▼84.9%
2020	▼3,251.6	▼48,720	▼2,725.9	▼40,844	▼-10.0%	▼0.9%	▲4.6%	▲104.8%
2021	▲3,601.6	▲53,773	▲3,195.3	▲47,707	▲8.5%	▲2.6%	▼4.5%	▼103.4%
2022	▲4,056.4	▲59,974	▼3,192.9	▼47,206	▲5.2%	▲9.1%	▼3.8%	▼97.5%
2023	▲4,217.9	▲61,552	▲3,422.1	▲49,938	▲0.3%	▲7.3%	▲4.1%	▲98.9%
2024	▲4,369.7	▲63,072	▲3,695.4	▲53,339	▲1.1%	▼2.5%	▲4.3%	▲99.9%
2025	▲4,553.1	▲65,525	▲4,003.0	▲57,608	▲1.3%	▲3.4%	▲4.9%	▲102.3%

== See also ==
- List of companies of the United Kingdom A–J
- List of companies of the United Kingdom K–Z
- Economic geography of the United Kingdom
- List of British billionaires by net worth
- List of recessions in the United Kingdom
- United Kingdom government sanctions
- Universal Credit
- Universal basic income in the United Kingdom
- National Wealth Fund
- Trade unions in the United Kingdom

== Bibliography ==
- DEFRA (2020). Agriculture in the United Kingdom 2019. HM Government. ISBN 978-1-8397-2093-2.
