= Atish R. Ghosh =

Indian economist

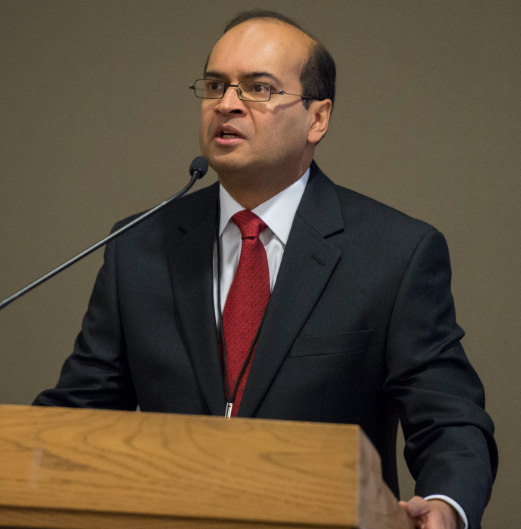
- Born: February 21, 1964 (age 62)

Academic background
- Education: Oxford University (MSc); Harvard University (BA, MA, PhD)

Academic work
- Discipline: International economics
- Institutions: International Monetary Fund
- Website: Information at IDEAS / RePEc

Atish Rex Ghosh (born February 21, 1964) is an international economist, who is currently the Historian of the International Monetary Fund. His recent work has focused on issues related to the stability of the international monetary system, including exchange rate regimes, external balance dynamics, capital flows and capital controls, monetary and foreign exchange intervention policies, fiscal space and debt sustainability, and international policy coordination. His work on the management of cross-border capital flows, notably the role of capital controls, has played an important role in influencing the IMF's institutional position on the use of capital controls. Ghosh has also published numerous influential studies on international policy coordination and exchange rate regimes, including three books: Economic Cooperation in an Uncertain World (Wiley-Blackwell Press); Exchange Rate Regimes: Choices and Consequences (MIT Press); and Currency Boards in Retrospect and Prospect (MIT Press). In addition, he is the author of Nineteenth Street, NW—a fictional novel about a global financial crash.

== Early career ==
Ghosh received his B.A., M.A., and Ph.D. in Economics from Harvard University. He also holds an MSc. in Development Economics from Oxford University. Before joining the IMF, Ghosh was an Assistant Professor of Economics and International Affairs at Princeton University.

At the IMF, Ghosh worked on the Ukrainian and Turkish economic stabilization programs in the 1990s, and has also served as Assistant Director of the Research Department where he supervised analytical work on issues related to the international monetary system.

== Research and publication ==
Ghosh's research focuses on various aspects of domestic and international macroeconomic policy, including choices and consequences of exchange rate regimes, capital flows and capital controls, fiscal space, debt sustainability, external balance dynamics, and policy coordination. He has written and edited several books on international economic issues such as Economic Cooperation in an Uncertain World (Wiley-Blackwell Press, 1994), Exchange Rate Regimes: Choices and Consequences (MIT Press, 2003), and Currency Boards in Retrospect and Prospect (MIT Press, 2008). He has also published numerous articles in distinguished academic journals, such as the American Economic Review, the Economic Journal, the Journal of Monetary Economics, and the Journal of International Economics. His work has received widespread media coverage, including in The Economist, the Financial Times, The New York Times, and The Wall Street Journal.

Ghosh was appointed as the IMF Historian by the IMF Managing Director, Christine Lagarde, on April 7, 2016. In this capacity, he will write the IMF's official history over 2000-15—a period characterized by the rise in global imbalances and surge in international capital flows, the 2008 financial crisis, the Euro area crisis, and the growing role of emerging and developing countries in the world economy.

== Novel ==
Ghosh is the author of Nineteenth Street, N.W.—a fictional novel about a global financial crash. The thriller, now in its second edition, explores the threat of financial terrorism and revolves around a plan to sabotage the global currency markets.
