= Saving-investment balance =

Balance of national savings and investments

In economics, saving-investment balance or I-S balance is a balance of national savings and national investment, which is equal to current account. This relationship is obtained from the national income identity.

== Description ==
This is the national income identity:

$$Y=C+I+G+(EX-IM)$$

where

- Y: GDP,
- C: national consumption,
- I: national investment,
- G: government spending,
- EX: export,
- IM: import,
- EX－IM: current account.

The national income identity can be rewritten as following:

$$(Y-T-C)+(T-G)-I=EX-IM$$

where T is defined as tax. (Y-T-C) is savings of private sector and (T-G) is savings of government. Here, we define S as National savings (= savings of private sector + savings of government) and rewrite the identity as following:

$$S-I=EX-IM$$

This identity implies that the difference of national savings and national investment is equal to current account.

== See also ==
- Global imbalances
- Global saving glut
