= Visible balance =

The visible trade balance (merchandise trade balance) is that part of the balance of trade figures that refers to international trade in physical goods, but not trade in services; it thus contrasts with the invisible balance.

The balance is calculated as the value of visible exports less the value of visible imports. If the figure is positive then this is a surplus; it is negative then it is a deficit.

Most countries do not have a zero visible balance: they usually run a surplus or a deficit. This will be offset by trade in services, other income transfers, investments and monetary flows, leading to an overall balance of payments. The visible balance is affected by changes in the volumes of imports and exports, and also by changes in the terms of trade.

In aggregate, the World often appears to have a negative visible balance with itself; i.e. imports of goods appear to exceed exports. There are numerous causes for this, such as measuring imports on a cost, insurance and freight basis while measuring exports on a free on board basis, or statistical errors occurring when imports are more closely recorded than exports.

== In Balance of Payments sheets ==
Prior to 1973 there was no standard way to break down BoP sheets. The top level divisions were sometimes separation into visible and invisible payments. Following changes in the nature of international trade caused by the breakdown of the Bretton Woods system, the principle division for BoP sheets became the Current account and the Capital account (or Current account and Fianancial account if the IMF's definition is being used.) Since 1973, 'visible' and 'invisible' payments are still sometimes used as subheadings under the Current account.
