= Global imbalances =

Global imbalances refers to the situation where some countries have more assets than the other countries. In theory, when the current account is in balance, it has a zero value: inflows and outflows of capital will be cancelled by each other. Hence, if the current account is persistently showing deficits for certain period, it is said to show an inequilibrium. Since, by definition, all current accounts and net foreign assets of the countries in the world must become zero, then other countries become indebted with the other nations. During recent years, global imbalances have become a concern in the rest of the world. The United States has run long term deficits, as well as many other advanced economies, while in Asia and emerging economies the opposite has occurred.

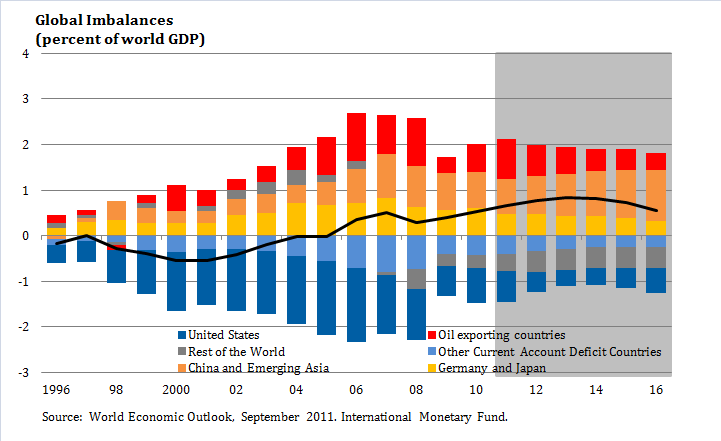

== A technical definition ==
They refer to global imbalances as "external positions of systemically important economies that reflect distortions or entail risks for the global economy". The three parts of this definition can be re-defined further:

1. External positions: this refers not only to current account flows, but also the net foreign assets of countries (which, if changes in the prices of those assets and liabilities are zero, then it is the accumulated sum of past net current account flows).
2. Systemically important economies: these are the economic blocks running the imbalances, that are relevant to the world market operations, e.g. China, the Euro area or the United States.
3. Reflect distortions or entail risks: this parts concerns both the causes (distortions) and possible consequences (risks) of the imbalances. This means that even an external imbalance that was not originated on some market distortion, would fall under the definition of global imbalances, if significant risks arise from it.

== History ==
Global imbalances are far from being a new phenomenon in economic history. There are many periods where they were present, although here only those periods where some data is available will be referred to.

The first period of global imbalances that will be presented, occurred during the years 1870 to 1914 (a former era of financial globalisation) where massive flows of capital flew from the core countries of Western Europe to the countries of recent settlement overseas (especially the Americas and Australasia). Current account surpluses run by Britain, Germany, France and the Netherlands reached approximately 9% of GDP, while for the destination of the flows (Argentina, Australia and Canada) the deficit exceeded 5%.

The process of adjustment of these imbalances relates to the price specie flow mechanism of the classical gold standard, which was smooth, in general, with exception of the Barings Crisis in 1890 for some countries.

During the First World War, the participating countries abandoned gold convertibility, with exception of the United States. After the war, by 1926, the major countries got back to a gold standard, where the countries held reserves in dollars, sterling and francs, and the United States, Great Britain and France held gold. But this system had some serious flaws which prevented that the imbalances generated were adjusted smoothly. Real exchange rates were misaligned, and the system began to lose credibility (since, at the time, it seemed that external concerns came second after domestic concerns). The collapse began after 1929: speculative attacks on countries following expansionary policies to alleviate the effects of the Great Depression, and soon had to leave the gold standard. The United States continue until 1933. The imbalance during this period, however, where not as large in magnitude as they were before the First World War.

After the Second World War, under the Bretton Woods system, the U.S. was the country with the largest gold reserves, and had to peg the dollar to gold at 35 dollars per ounce, as the rest of the world pegged to the dollar. Stronger restrictions existed on cross-border capital flows, compared to the gold standard, that did not allow countries to run big surpluses or deficits in the current account, as it was the case during the classical gold standard regime. The system ended in 1971, amidst expansionary policies in the United States, that lead European countries to begin converting their dollar claims into gold, threatening U.S. gold reserves.

Another periods of smaller imbalances began after the end of the Bretton Woods system, but their magnitude is much smaller than the ones of the beginning of the 21st century, involving different sets of countries and with different resolutions.

=== Current episode ===
Making a comparison with the former global imbalances, the current period has unprecedented features. This is the first time that capital flows go mostly from emerging market economies (mainly Asia and the Oil exporting economies), to advanced economies. Also, the foreign asset positions have become much larger in both gross and net terms, and the degree of capital mobility is the highest in decades. Hence, the size of these imbalances are only comparable to the period previous to the First World War. Also the conditions under which they appeared are different. New participants that were in the periphery of global trade and finance before, have become an important part of the international markets, after a process of economic liberalisation, falling transportation costs, information technology and the deepening of financial markets and global chains of production. The financial links among the economies has also increased. And the macroeconomic and financial conditions improved, especially during 2003-2007, with record economic growth and low financial market volatility. As it will explained later, this are important factors in generating the increased globalisation of financial markets.

== Causes ==
The essential requirement to make large global imbalances in world, is the monetary globalisation or, in other words, freeing and opening the financial markets. Without this, it is not able to produce the amount of capital flows between countries. However, not every monetary globalisation should lead to imbalances. Other factors are important as well.

One factor is increases in the bank savings from emerging countries, especially in Asian Countries and Commodity Exporter economies, part of what is known as the Savings Glut. These economies increased their foreign exchange reserves to respond to future balance of payment. Of course, there are some other reasons, such as low levels of social security in emerging countries, as well as the fixed or flexible foreign exchange systems of many of these countries. In some advanced countries, such as Germany, Japan and New Zealand, the ageing issue has been a very important factor increasing the amount of the savings.

So far, we have explained why some countries have accumulated many savings, but not why they are held abroad (besides the precautionary savings explanation). One reason, is that the financial development has not been followed at the same pace as the financial openness. This can be seen in a very small markets to generate safe assets where to store value from one period to the next. For this reason, many countries have decided to invest those assets abroad, in the more financially developed countries, such as the United States and the United Kingdom, in the form of Sovereign Wealth Funds, portfolio investments and foreign reserves, indicating the existence of shortages in safe assets as well. Another explanation is that ageing population do not find profitable investment vehicles to invest at home, and end up investing them abroad.

Also, some coincidental factors amplified the extent of the imbalances. The decreasing output volatility in advanced economies (i.e. Great Moderation), led to less savings and a decrease in risk aversion, that was reflected in deepening current account deficits.

== The Great Recession ==
Global imbalances helped fuel the 2008 financial crisis, even though it did not cause it. The Savings Glut helped push down the yields on Treasury bonds, through the foreign purchases. This reduction in interest rate, in addition to other policy measures adopted by central banks, encouraged risk taking and underestimation of risks, on the verge of financial innovation, that might as well had been boosted by this financial environment. It also helped in the increase of leverage in advanced economies, and the formation of the housing market bubble in many of them, through the relaxed credit conditions. Also the increase in the financial linkages, lead to a rapid contagion across economies. It would not be hard to argue that the economic policies followed by the emerging markets, led to the ability of advanced economy to borrow cheaply abroad and finance the bubbles in the housing and financial markets.

Even though many of the policies adopted or discussed since the beginning of the Great Recession, have centred on the sectors of Finance, Housing and Public Debt, among other issues, the presence of Global Imbalances still remains as a factor, that although reduced, points out the need of reforms of the international monetary and financial system to correct the imbalances, and hence, the distortions and market imperfections that gave them origin in first place.

== See also ==
- Global saving glut
- Saving-investment balance
