= Double deficit (economics) =

Both national budget and current account in deficit

A country's economy has a double deficit when it is operating in deficit on two important metrics: the government budget balance and the current account (balance of payments).

A deficit in the government's budget balance means that the government is spending in excess of taxation revenue and the deficit is made good by borrowing, which adds to the national debt. While borrowing for investment purposes is generally seen as wise, to do so to fund routine recurrent expenditure is not.

A country's current account records the value of exports and imports of both goods and services and international transfers of capital. It is one of the two components of its balance of payments, the other being the capital account (also known as the financial account). Current account measures the nation's earnings and spendings abroad and it consists of the balance of trade, net primary income or factor income (earnings on foreign investments minus payments made to foreign investors) and net unilateral transfers, that have taken place over a given period of time. The current account balance is one of two major measures of a country's foreign trade (the other being the net capital outflow). A current account surplus indicates that the value of a country's net foreign assets (i.e. assets less liabilities) grew over the period in question, and a current account deficit indicates that it shrank. Both government and private payments are included in the calculation. It is called the current account because goods and services are generally consumed in the current period.

== See also ==
- Twin deficits hypothesis: the economic theory that there is a strong causal link between a nation's government budget balance and its current account balance
