= Net international investment position =

Concept in economics

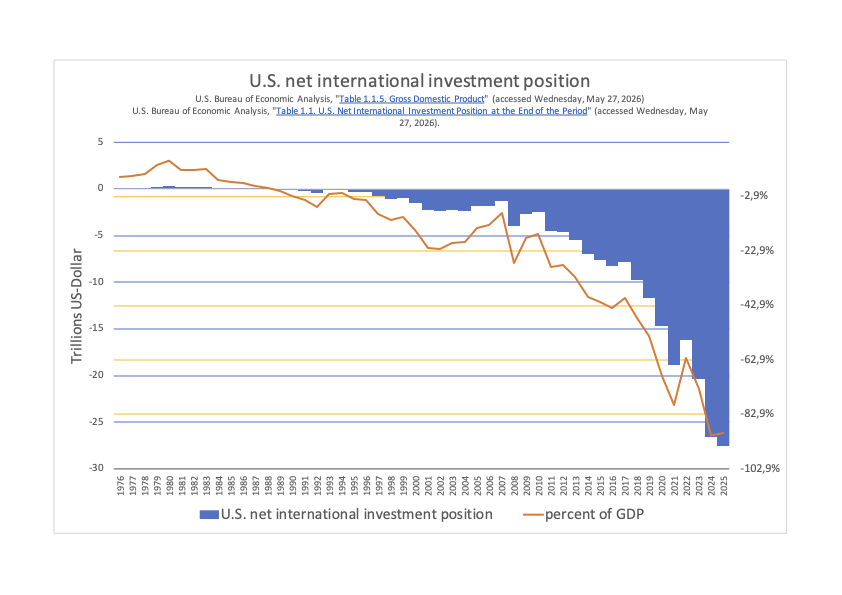
U.S. net international investment position (NIIP) from 1976 to 2025

The net international investment position (NIIP) is the difference between the external financial assets and liabilities of a country. External debt of a country includes government debt and private debt. External assets publicly and privately held by a country's legal residents are also taken into account when calculating NIIP. Commodities and currencies tend to follow a cyclical pattern of significant valuation changes, which is also reflected in NIIP.

The international investment position (IIP) of a country is a financial statement of the value and composition of its external financial assets and liabilities. A positive NIIP value indicates that a nation is a creditor nation, while a negative value indicates that it is a debtor nation.

In 1980, the United States net international-creditor position was bigger than the total net creditor-positions of all the other countries in the world. Only six years later, in 1986, when the nation’s international investment position was at a year-end negative $107.4 billion, the U.S. became a net-debtor nation for the first time since 1914, when its nominal debt had reached $2 billion. By 1990, the U.S. was the world's largest debtor. By the end of 2020, the country’s net international-investment position was a negative $14 trillion, an amount representing how much more the U.S. owed to the rest of the world than the rest of the world owed to the U.S. At the end of 2022, it stood at a negative $16 trillion. By 2026 it has risen to $26 trillion.

== List of countries and regions by net international investment position (NIIP) ==
List of countries and regions by net international investment position (NIIP)
Countries and regions	NIIP (US$ millions)	GDP (US$ millions)	NIIP (% of GDP)	Date
Albania	-12,623	26,130	-52.1	2026 Q2
Algeria	+36,204	260,134	+19.2	2025
Andorra	+21,416	3,790	+565.1	2023
Angola	-16,623	113,286	-14.7	2024 Q3
Argentina	+18,430	604,382	+26.3	2026 Q2
Armenia	-13,328	25,251	-73.1	2026 Q2
Australia	-441,812	1,802,006	-41.1	2026 Q2
Austria	+179,640	535,804	+21.7	2026 Q2
Bangladesh	-86,746	451,468	-13.5	2024 Q2
Belarus	-19,219	73,129	-51.7	2024 Q3
Belgium	+446,628	662,183	+57.3	2026 Q2
Bhutan	-4,035	3,151	-104.2	2024 Q1
Bolivia	-6,794	48,172	-23.3	2026 Q2
Bosnia and Herzegovina	-6,872	28,404	-24.2	2024 Q3
Brazil	-1,312,747	2,188,419	-39.6	2026 Q2
Bulgaria	-10,889	108,425	-4.7	2026 Q2
Cambodia	-32,710	47,147	-94.2	2026 Q2
Canada	+1,369,556	2,214,796	+58.7	2026 Q2
Chile	-71,624	328,720	-9.4	2026 Q2
China	+3,824,930	19,400,000	+20.9	2026 Q2
Colombia	-204,240	417,207	-51.7	2026 Q2
Democratic Republic of the Congo	-20,837	49,613	-42.0	2020
Costa Rica	-40,539	95,149	-42.6	2024 Q3
Croatia	-20,901	89,665	-22.3	2024 Q3
Cyprus	-35,255	34,790	-84.6	2026 Q2
Czech Republic	-24,422	342,992	-8.3	2026 Q2
Denmark	+ 562,887	462,500	+117	2026 Q2
Dominican Republic	-75,064	126,238	-59.5	2024 Q3
Egypt	-305,299	380,034	-72.9	2026 Q2
Estonia	-585	43,044	-13.2	2026 Q2
EU	+2,220,130	15,544,860	+7.0	2026 Q2
Finland	+55,732	306,083	+19.6	2026 Q2
France	-986,431	3,174,099	-24.7	2026 Q2
Germany	+4,437,092	5,010,000	+82.1	2026 Q1
Greece	-396,706	252,732	-129.8	2026 Q2
Hong Kong	+2,475,602	368,633	+487.5	2026 Q2
Hungary	-122,837	228,806	-33.1	2026 Q2
Iceland	+17,441	32,919	+40.5	2026 Q2
India	-220,371	3,889,130	-9.0	2026 Q2
Indonesia	-197,431	1,402,590	-19.5	2026 Q2
Ireland	-342,637	560,566	-80.1	2026 Q2
Israel	+250,380	528,067	+46.0	2026 Q1
Italy	+382,467	2,376,510	+12.2	2026 Q2
Japan	+3,450,508	4,470,094	+76.7	2026 Q2
Kazakhstan	-49,791	292,553	-17.0	2024 Q3
Kuwait	+120,063	161,822	+74.2	2024 Q3
Latvia	-9,861	45,521	-22.3	2024 Q3
Lithuania	+1,112	82,789	+1.3	2024 Q3
Luxembourg	+34,551	91,210	+37.6	2024 Q3
Malaysia	-9,482	439,748	+2.2	2024 Q3
Malta	+24,387	24,397	+98.6	2024 Q3
Mexico	-636,520	1,848,125	-34.4	2024 Q3
Mongolia	-42,853	23,669	-181.1	2024 Q3
Montenegro	-8,482	8,110	-104.6	2024 Q3
Mozambique	-69,977	22,495	-311.1	2024 Q1
Netherlands	+630,430	1,218,401	+54.6	2026 Q1
New Zealand	-119,310	252,236	-47.3	2024 Q3
Nicaragua	-17,964	19,412	-92.5	2024 Q3
Nigeria	-71,484	199,721	-35.8	2024 Q3
Norway	+2,004,360	503,752	+318.6	2026 Q1
Pakistan	-128,962	374,595	-34.4	2024 Q3
Panama	-76,574	87,347	-87.7	2024 Q3
Peru	-101,848	283,309	-37.4	2024 Q3
Philippines	-59,236	470,062	-12.6	2024 Q3
Poland	-285,180	862,908	-30.9	2024 Q3
Portugal	-174,456	303,032	-62.8	2026 Q2
Romania	-138,238	380,561	-40.4	2024
Russia	+1,110,673	1,710,734	+26.8	2026 Q1
Saudi Arabia	+744,164	1,100,706	+67.6	2024 Q3
Serbia	-55,342	82,550	-67.0	2024 Q3
Singapore	+1,218,405	530,708	+164.6	2026 Q2
Slovakia	-73,393	142,617	-51.0	2024 Q3
Slovenia	+4,660	73,198	+6.3	2024 Q3
South Africa	+111,916	403,045	+27.8	2024 Q3
South Korea	+64,049	1,869,916	+52.3	2026 Q2
Spain	-841,942	1,731,469	-49.0	2026 Q1
Sudan	-85,180	29,793	-248.5	2018–2021
Sweden	+331,662	609,039	+52.5	2024 Q3
Switzerland	+1,219,870	942,265	+114.9	2026 Q2
Taiwan	+1,349,641	759,104	+205.1	2026 Q1
Thailand	+37,455	528,919	+7.1	2024 Q3
Tunisia	-63,678	44,265	-162.6	2019–2021
Turkey	-318,218	1,344,318	-23.7	2024 Q3
Uganda	-28,879	55,587	-52.0	2023–2024
Ukraine	-78,055	184,099	-8.2	2026 Q1
United Kingdom	-250,897	3,587,585	-31.3	2026 Q2
United States	-22,420,319	30,770,000	-71.1	2026 Q2
Uzbekistan	+16,326	112,653	+14.5	2024 Q3
Zambia	-28,516	25,913	-110.0	2023–2024

== Creditor nations ==
This is a list of the top creditor nations of the world sorted by their net international investment positions (NIIPs) per capita. A creditor nation is a sovereign state that has a positive NIIP. The table uses the latest available data, mostly from websites approved by the International Monetary Fund, and includes Macau and Hong Kong because of their special economic statuses. Population figures may list citizens only or total population, therefore ranking and figures may vary. The 6 Gulf Cooperation Council countries are widely considered to be creditor nations (and perhaps some of the largest ones), but because of Islamic sensitivities about credit and debt, they seldom report their external assets and liabilities.

Country / territory	Currency used	External Assets (millions)	External Liabilities (millions)	NIIP (millions)	NIIP (millions USD)	Population	Per Capita (USD)	Date and ref.
Macau	–	523% of GDP	244% of GDP	279.6% of GDP	129,175	601,000	214,934	Dec 2015
Hong Kong	HKD	40,681,611	30,440,448	10,241,163	1,309,268	7,409,800	176,694	Oct. 2017
Singapore	SGD	4,150,371	3,306,317	844,054	596,859	3,902,700	152,935	Dec. 2015
Norway	NOK	12,994,059	6,785,470	6,208,589	701,965	5,213,985	134,631	Dec. 2015
Switzerland	CHF	4,260,301	3,651,607	608,694	607,782	8,325,200	73,005	Dec. 2015
Taiwan	USD	1,634,712	580,807	1,053,905	1,053,905	23,492,074	44,862	Dec. 2015
Luxembourg	EUR	9,470,481	9,454,006	16,475	17,887	576,200	31,043	Dec. 2015
Netherlands	EUR	7,583,186	7,171,832	411,354	446,620	16,980,049	26,303	Dec. 2015
Belgium	EUR	1,973,000	1,719,000	254,000	275,775	11,268,000	24,474	Dec. 2015
Mauritius	MUR	15,178,485	14,106,085	1,072,400	29,934	1,262,862	23,704	Dec. 2015
Saudi Arabia	SAR	3,548,790	1,283,100	2,265,690	604,758	24,000,000	25,198	Dec. 2016
Japan	JPY	948,729,000	609,466,000	339,263,000	2,812,543	127,043,000	22,139	Dec. 2015
Denmark	DKK	5,924,000	5,090,000	834,000	121,352	5,707,300	21,263	Dec. 2015
Germany	EUR	7,903,800	6,415,600	1,488,200	1,615,783	81,770,900	19,760	Dec. 2015
Malta	EUR	223,235	218,748	4,487	4,872	429,344	11,347	Dec. 2015
Israel	USD	418,535	283,411	135,124	135,125	8,464,200	8,097	Sep. 2017
South Korea	USD	1,494,722	1,173,651	321,071	321,071	52,617,000	6,104	Jun. 2018
Russia	USD	1,596,563	772,192	824,371	824,371	146,500,000	5,627	Mar. 2023
China	USD	6,218,905	4,622,452	1,596,453	1,596,453	1,367,820,000	1,167	Dec. 2015

== Debtor nations ==
This is a list of debtor nations of the world sorted by their net international investment positions (NIIPs) per capita. A debtor nation is a sovereign state that has a negative NIIP, i.e. a country that has net external liabilities, not net external assets. The table uses data from respective national government statistical agencies, Eurostat, or IMF. Though many do, a large portion of nations do not report data to the IMF. Parallel reports from government or international agencies may report vastly different data.

Country / territory	Currency used	External Assets (millions)	External Liabilities (millions)	NIIP (millions)	NIIP (millions USD)	Population	Per capita (USD)	% of GDP	Date
United States	USD	31,680,100	47,792,200	–16,112,100	–16,112,100	332,300,000	–48,487	–63.3%	4Qtr 2022
Australia	AUD	–	–	–1,043,300	–762,000	24,000,000	–31,758	–56.8%	Sep 2016
Greece	EUR	–	–	–222,323	–266,787	10,000,000	–26,678	–126.4%	2014
Cyprus	EUR	–	–	–24,468	–29,361	1,140,000	–25,755	–139.8%	2014
Portugal	EUR	–	–	–196,053	–235,263	10,500,000	–22,406	–113.3%	2014
Spain	EUR	–	–	–978,000	–978,000	46,400,000	–21,005	–81.7%	Q2 2018
United Kingdom	GBP	–	–	–431,454	–690,326	65,000,000	–10,620	–24.1%	2014
Brazil	USD	777,674	1,434,811	–657,136	–657,136	205,000,000	–3,567	–31.2%	Jun 2015
Indonesia	USD	214,481	627,588	–413,106	–413,106	250,000,000	–1,652	–47.5%	Dec 2014
India	INR	920,600	1,280,400	–359,800	–359,800	1,410,000,000	–255	–11.6%	Mar 2022
Philippines	USD	240,935	368,557	–27,603	–27,603	113,000,000	–244	–7.0%	Dec 2021

== See also ==
- Net foreign assets
- List of countries by external debt
- List of countries by government debt
