= List of countries by current account balance =

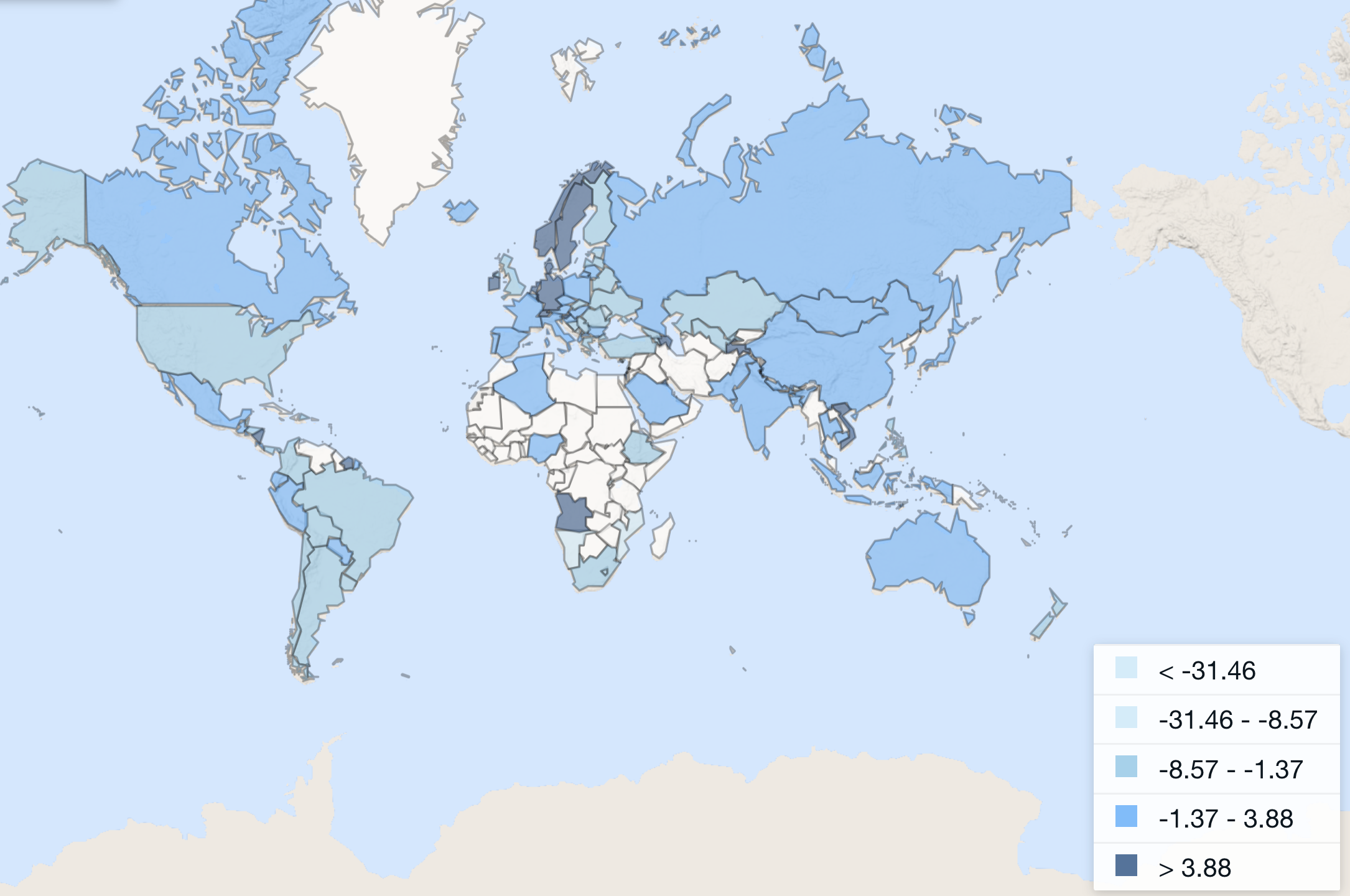
World map by current account balance (% of GDP), 2023, according to World Bank

This is the list of countries by current account balance, expressed in current U.S. dollars and as percentage of GDP, based on the data published by World Bank, United Nations Conference on Trade and Development and Organisation for Economic Co-operation and Development. The list includes sovereign states and self-governing dependent territories based upon the ISO standard ISO 3166-1.

According to World Bank, ″the current account balance is the sum of net exports of goods and services, net primary income, and net secondary income.″ Data are based on the sixth edition of the IMF's Balance of Payments Manual (BPM6) and are only available from 2005 onwards.

According to United Nations Conference on Trade and Development, ″the current account forms part of the balance of payments and displays the flows of goods, services, primary income, and secondary income between residents and nonresidents of an economy. The current account balance measures, in general, the difference between current receipts and expenditures for internationally traded goods, services and income payments. At the same time, from a national perspective, the current account balance represents the gap between domestic saving and investment.″

According to Organisation for Economic Co-operation and Development, ″the current account balance of payments is a record of a country's international transactions with the rest of the world. The current account includes all the transactions (other than those in financial items) that involve economic values and occur between resident and non-resident entities. Also covered are offsets to current economic values provided or acquired without a quid pro quo. This indicator is measured in million USD and percentage of GDP.″

== List of countries by current account balance ==
The following table provides information on current account balance (CAB) based on data published by World Bank, United Nations Conference on Trade and Development and Organisation for Economic Co-operation and Development. Sorting is alphabetical by country code, according to ISO 3166-1 alpha-3.

Country/Territory/Region/Group	WB			UNCTAD (2022)		OECD (2023)	
Country/Territory/Region/Group	(mil. USD)	(% of GDP)	Year	(mil. USD)	(% of GDP)	(mil. USD)	(% of GDP)
(United Nations) WORLD				338657.35	0.34		
Aruba	230.56	6.50	2022	389.05	11.14		
Afghanistan	−3136.73	−15.72	2020	−3136.73	−15.57		
Angola	4210.06	4.97	2023	11762.88	16.68		
Anguilla				−126.48	−37.95		
Albania	−202.32	−0.88	2023	−1134.67	−6.20		
Andorra	583.20	17.25	2022				
United Arab Emirates				59616.82	12.09		
Argentina	−21493.97	−3.36	2023	−3787.74	−0.60	−20371.92	−3.15
Armenia	−510.10	−2.11	2023	−167.04	−0.86		
Antigua and Barbuda	−262.10	−12.89	2023	−284.52	−17.20		
Australia	21383.79	1.24	2023	19548.33	1.09	4797.08	0.28
Austria	13686.37	2.65	2023	3234.00	0.69	15087.97	2.92
Azerbaijan	8329.37	11.51	2023	23478.08	33.60		
Burundi	−362.64	−13.60	2018	−612.90	−13.32		
Belgium	−6205.46	−0.98	2023	−20251.54	−3.50	−6195.25	−0.99
Benin	−734.66	−4.15	2021	−912.80	−5.28		
Burkina Faso	−1403.97	−7.46	2022	−1099.60	−5.58		
Bangladesh	4387.57	1.00	2023	−14369.59	−3.32		
Bulgaria	−248.13	−0.24	2023	−591.65	−0.66		
Bahrain	2699.47	6.25	2023	6838.56	15.45		
Bahamas	−1763.09	−13.42	2022	−1519.20	−11.99		
Bosnia and Herzegovina	−760.47	−2.81	2023	−1101.19	−4.39		
Belarus	−1020.27	−1.42	2023	2677.45	3.63		
Belize	−90.63	−2.76	2023	−258.49	−8.93		
Bermuda	962.26	13.21	2021	444.20	5.81		
Bolivia	−1246.88	−2.72	2023	−151.55	−0.35		
Brazil	−30828.24	−1.42	2023	−56997.41	−3.04	−24317.66	−1.11
Barbados	−296.40	−5.93	2017	−611.55	−10.87		
Brunei	3264.03	19.57	2022	3264.03	19.68		
Bhutan	−1000.00	−33.32	2023	−852.58	−34.48		
Botswana	606.39	2.98	2022	606.39	3.43		
Central African Republic	−24.68	−2.90	1994	−234.70	−9.67		
Canada	−13254.65	−0.62	2023	−6654.34	−0.31	−15564.55	−0.73
Switzerland	67821.24	7.66	2023	81459.35	9.84	60892.82	6.89
Chile	−11899.04	−3.55	2023	−27101.82	−9.00	−11317.73	−3.37
China	252987.27	1.42	2023	401855.41	2.22	252987.30	1.42
Ivory Coast	−5393.83	−7.69	2022	−5098.40	−7.58		
Cameroon	−1505.13	−3.45	2022	−3028.90	−6.93		
Democratic Republic of the Congo	−587.41	−1.06	2021	−869.20	−1.48		
Republic of the Congo	1715.91	11.57	2021	3302.50	24.99		
Colombia	−9715.36	−2.67	2023	−21252.36	−6.24	−9116.77	−2.54
Comoros	−6.61	−0.53	2022	−66.10	−5.10		
Cape Verde	−82.49	−3.19	2023	−67.73	−3.57		
Costa Rica	−844.64	−0.98	2023	−2706.05	−3.98	−1284.50	−1.48
Curaçao	−877.28	−28.54	2022	−499.00	−16.60		
Cayman Islands	−821.40	−13.55	2021	−580.90	−8.75		
Cyprus	−3885.79	−12.06	2023	−2625.39	−9.26		
Czech Republic	1280.62	0.39	2023	−17365.73	−5.99	531.37	0.14
Germany	262722.96	5.90	2023	172723.85	4.24	274866.80	6.16
Djibouti	656.21	17.86	2022	−182.31	−4.53		
Dominica	−221.94	−33.94	2023	−163.00	−26.37		
Denmark	44195.31	10.93	2023	51460.72	13.14	40585.43	9.96
Dominican Republic	−4376.30	−3.60	2023	−6326.80	−5.64		
Algeria	5423.60	2.26	2023	18279.19	9.28		
Ecuador	2291.32	1.93	2023	2711.40	2.34		
Egypt	−10536.56	−2.21	2022	−10536.56	−2.64		
Eritrea	−104.66	−14.82	2000	234.80	9.56		
Spain	41093.57	2.60	2023	7575.16	0.54	42335.91	2.68
Estonia	−848.53	−2.08	2023	−1104.33	−2.84	−608.55	−1.50
Ethiopia	−4787.66	−2.92	2023	−5160.40	−4.45		
Finland	−4364.14	−1.45	2023	−10294.65	−3.64	−2461.52	−0.83
Fiji	−865.67	−17.38	2022	−867.96	−18.41		
France	−22791.59	−0.75	2023	−59707.69	−2.14	−22845.92	−0.75
Faroe Islands	194.30	7.75	2011				
Federated States of Micronesia	22.41	7.02	2014	4.48	1.05		
Gabon	141.00	0.98	2015	260.11	1.30		
United Kingdom	−110393.16	−3.31	2023	−121382.30	−3.96	−110055.50	−3.29
Georgia	−1326.39	−4.34	2023	−979.30	−3.94		
Ghana	−1516.94	−2.04	2022	−1517.03	−2.04		
Guinea	3350.24	15.95	2022	3350.24	16.60		
Gambia	−90.25	−4.15	2022	−243.00	−11.03		
Guinea-Bissau	−146.64	−8.55	2022	−105.00	−6.82		
Equatorial Guinea	−344.04	−148.00	1996	674.40	3.99		
Greece	−15055.69	−6.32	2023	−21131.95	−9.62	−15963.13	−6.70
Grenada	−184.24	−13.95	2023	−55.23	−4.69		
Guatemala	3281.14	3.22	2023	1319.43	1.43		
Guyana	−254.12	−1.73	2022	3182.90	39.57		
Hong Kong	35365.79	9.26	2023	37909.20	10.44		
Honduras	−1334.62	−3.88	2023	−1074.30	−3.38		
Croatia	956.97	1.16	2023	−1464.48	−2.08		
Haiti	−491.95	−2.43	2022	−481.00	−2.53		
Hungary	623.55	0.29	2023	−14243.43	−8.55	383.14	0.14
Indonesia	−1879.59	−0.14	2023	13125.65	1.00	−2140.99	−0.15
India	−32336.34	−0.91	2023	−80433.19	−2.31	−30585.86	−0.88
Ireland	53997.14	9.90	2023	46520.99	9.10	43887.65	7.96
Iran	12481.00	11.39	2000	−1651.00	−0.32		
Iraq	58009.50	20.24	2022	31423.00	11.75		
Iceland	324.66	1.05	2023	−451.41	−1.62	222.34	0.72
Israel	25089.00	4.92	2023	18436.00	3.61	24902.80	4.93
Italy	11551.65	0.51	2023	−26658.11	−1.33	10928.10	0.48
Jamaica	−129.76	−0.76	2022	−129.76	−0.81		
Jordan	−4159.13	−8.55	2022	−4159.15	−8.63		
Japan	150690.62	3.58	2023	90963.10	2.17	150824.50	3.60
Kazakhstan	−8658.42	−3.31	2023	8527.56	3.86		
Kenya	−5765.54	−5.08	2022	−5765.54	−4.97		
Kyrgyzstan	−5179.63	−42.68	2022	−5422.24	−49.75		
Cambodia	552.61	1.74	2023	−7582.25	−26.23		
Kiribati	−6.46	−2.39	2022	−8.95	−3.99		
Saint Kitts and Nevis	−143.26	−13.30	2023	−33.20	−3.50		
South Korea	35488.20	2.07	2023	29830.90	1.79	35487.80	1.93
Kuwait	51396.16	31.77	2023	63082.18	33.96		
Laos	−10.95	−0.07	2022	−1028.70	−6.50		
Lebanon	−5642.83	−31.46	2023	−5909.60	−15.57		
Liberia	64.81	1.62	2022				
Libya	5675.30	11.88	2021	−4780.20	−10.20		
Saint Lucia	−45.38	−1.80	2023	−53.32	−2.58		
Sri Lanka	1558.91	1.85	2023	−1453.50	−2.03		
Lesotho	−117.50	−5.74	2023	−149.89	−6.32		
Lithuania	1505.70	1.93	2023	−3583.03	−5.06	1491.57	1.92
Luxembourg	5825.75	6.79	2023	3060.28	3.68	5388.96	6.24
Latvia	−1751.64	−4.02	2023	−2642.19	−6.24	−1661.92	−3.81
Macau	2782.38	11.37	2022	−5172.07	−24.37		
Morocco	−4775.21	−3.65	2022	−4775.21	−3.48		
Moldova	−1973.65	−11.93	2023	−2275.20	−15.81		
Madagascar	−829.38	−5.42	2022	−1209.10	−8.06		
Maldives	−1033.06	−16.74	2022	−1033.06	−17.23		
Mexico	−5715.66	−0.32	2023	−13423.48	−0.95	−4394.05	−0.24
Marshall Islands	76.26	29.58	2021	−20.92	−7.59		
North Macedonia	99.23	0.67	2023	−840.41	−6.12		
Mali	−1475.43	−7.86	2022	−1320.94	−7.22		
Malta	−1019.62	−5.55	2022	−1019.62	−5.80		
Myanmar	67.72	0.09	2019	−2127.70	−3.77		
Montenegro	−841.77	−11.37	2023	−817.74	−13.89		
Mongolia	121.27	0.61	2023	−2303.50	−15.44		
Mozambique	−2425.51	−11.76	2023	−6295.47	−35.20		
Mauritania	−1424.10	−14.62	2022	−2003.00	−19.63		
Montserrat				−6.79	−8.80		
Mauritius	−654.05	−4.54	2023	−1580.09	−12.62		
Malawi	−2275.51	−17.33	2022	−2162.10	−17.43		
Malaysia	12271.24	3.01	2022	12271.24	3.02		
Namibia	−1847.55	−14.96	2023	−1568.96	−12.94		
New Caledonia	−654.24	−7.50	2016				
Niger	−2500.09	−16.20	2022	−2380.30	−16.53		
Nigeria	−805.78	−0.22	2023	1018.60	0.22		
Nicaragua	1381.20	7.75	2023	−215.89	−1.37		
Netherlands	112951.54	10.10	2023	43587.88	4.39	116937.00	10.45
Norway	86367.77	17.79	2023	175371.63	36.37	85229.84	17.56
Nepal	939.38	2.30	2023	−2470.62	−6.39		
Nauru	8.41	6.42	2018	8.41	6.08		
New Zealand	−16981.86	−6.70	2023	−21618.32	−8.88	−17169.41	−6.91
Oman	5652.23	4.93	2022	3741.20	3.26		
Pakistan	−350.04	−0.10	2023	−12129.11	−3.72		
Panama	−3738.67	−4.48	2023	−2967.00	−4.17		
Peru	2219.45	0.83	2023	−9908.20	−4.05		
Philippines	−11206.50	−2.56	2023	−17832.03	−4.41		
Palau	−135.43	−55.88	2022	−156.45	−67.86		
Papua New Guinea	4498.87	17.23	2021	9977.10	31.74		
Poland	12689.00	1.56	2023	−20651.00	−3.00	12597.05	1.55
Portugal	3974.15	1.38	2023	−3385.00	−1.34	4013.52	1.40
Paraguay	109.63	0.26	2023	−2713.00	−6.52		
Palestine	−2036.63	−10.63	2022	−2865.38	−14.64		
French Polynesia	411.96	7.49	2016				
Qatar	38117.31	17.50	2024	63117.98	27.77		
Romania	−24486.70	−6.98	2023	−27978.58	−9.37		
Russia	50224.44	2.48	2023	233018.50	10.89	49557.00	
Rwanda	−1653.72	−11.73	2023	−1306.26	−10.37		
Saudi Arabia	34070.46	3.19	2023	150753.11	14.20	33485.19	3.19
Sudan	−4442.78	−8.60	2022	−4442.78	−9.12		
Senegal	−3327.28	−12.09	2021	−5859.50	−21.39		
Singapore	99127.72	19.77	2023	90239.36	20.64		
Solomon Islands	−178.20	−10.92	2023	−218.53	−13.03		
Sierra Leone	−156.70	−3.83	2022	−438.20	−11.10		
El Salvador	−465.69	−1.37	2023	−2146.17	−6.81		
Serbia	−1953.96	−2.60	2023	−4433.99	−6.07		
South Sudan	−596.75	−11.73	2022	529.74	9.67		
São Tomé and Príncipe	−79.44	−14.64	2022	−76.04	−13.17		
Suriname	146.75	3.88	2023	71.31	2.02		
Slovakia	−2088.44	−1.57	2023	−9384.56	−8.27	−1816.47	−1.37
Slovenia	3056.92	4.48	2023	−284.37	−0.46	2917.72	4.25
Sweden	40072.86	6.75	2023	25014.84	4.24	37168.95	6.35
Eswatini	−140.97	−2.94	2022	−140.97	−3.13		
Sint Maarten	−41.64	−2.71	2022	−67.00	−5.43		
Seychelles	−155.19	−7.25	2023	−140.00	−8.21		
Syria	−367.39	−0.60	2010	−2481.30	−9.33		
Turks and Caicos Islands	172.71	15.30	2018				
Chad	−37.74	−3.20	1994	123.00	0.74		
Togo	−20.74	−0.28	2020	−204.80	−2.60		
Thailand	7002.07	1.36	2023	−17229.99	−3.45		
Tajikistan	584.02	4.84	2023	1634.60	16.06		
Turkmenistan				1468.55	3.20		
Timor-Leste	−227.62	−10.15	2023	−674.27	−30.53		
Tonga	−28.84	−5.76	2022	−31.43	−6.47		
Trinidad and Tobago	5381.91	17.91	2022	5381.91	19.39		
Tunisia	−4018.32	−9.01	2022	−3932.90	−8.42		
Turkey	−44961.00	−4.06	2023	−48751.00	−5.43	−43865.13	−3.97
Tuvalu	2.71	4.59	2022	2.48	4.04		
Taiwan				100877.00	13.27		
Tanzania	−5384.42	−7.11	2022	−5397.10	−6.95		
Uganda	−4172.07	−9.16	2022	−3947.19	−8.45		
Ukraine	−9209.00	−5.15	2023	7860.00	5.10		
Uruguay	−2796.90	−3.62	2023	−2268.14	−3.14		
United States	−818822.00	−2.99	2023	−943800.00	−3.69	−905376.00	−3.31
Uzbekistan	−7787.62	−8.57	2023	−628.28	−0.79		
Saint Vincent and the Grenadines	−142.76	−13.39	2023	−184.80	−19.84		
Venezuela	−3870.00	1.02	2016	−3870.00	−1.34		
Vietnam	25090.00	5.84	2023	−1074.00	−0.27		
Vanuatu	−127.43	−12.47	2022	−53.20	−5.36		
Samoa	46.51	4.98	2023	−78.20	−9.38		
Kosovo	−794.76	−7.61	2023				
Yemen	−2418.96	−7.72	2016	−2418.96	−12.92		
South Africa	−6159.98	−1.63	2023	−1788.75	−0.44	−6202.27	−1.63
Zambia	1093.01	3.75	2022	1154.62	4.24		
Zimbabwe	1096.26	5.10	2020	1096.26	5.06		
Developed economies				−336089.70	−0.56		
Developed economies: Americas				−950010.14	−3.43		
Developed economies: Asia				139230.00	2.18		
Developed economies: Europe				476760.43	2.02		
Developed economies: Oceania				−2069.99	−0.10		
Developing economies				674747.05	1.67		
Developing economies: Africa				−43814.27	−1.56		
Developing economies: Americas				−144622.16	−2.47		
Developing economies: Asia				854635.07	2.69		
Developing economies: Oceania				8548.41	20.67		
Developing economies excluding China				272891.64	1.22		
Developing economies excluding LDCs				739202.40	1.89		
LDCs (Least developed countries)				−64455.35	−4.91		
LDCs: Africa				−29381.28	−4.29		
LDCs: Asia				−33551.67	−5.56		
LDCs: Islands and Haiti				−1522.41	−6.07		
LLDCs (Landlocked Developing Countries)				300.02	0.03		
SIDS (Small Island Developing States) (UN-OHRLLS)				98364.49	10.75		
SIDS: Atlantic and Indian Ocean				4214.74	5.44		
SIDS: Caribbean				−3963.76	−1.11		
SIDS: Pacific				98113.51	20.41		
Low-income developing economies (UN)				−64662.68	−6.12		
Middle-income developing economies (UN)				−74673.10	−0.80		
High-income developing economies (UN)				814082.83	2.70		
BRICS				495654.56	1.91		
European Union				108810.42	0.65	348105.30	1.89
G7 (Group of Seven)						−617222.60	−1.32
G20 (Group of Twenty)				−229112.79	−0.27		
G77 (Group of 77)				603021.79	1.65		
OECD (Organisation for Economic Cooperation and Development)				−649041.65	−1.09	−198218.10	−0.31
