= Valuation effects =

In economics, valuation effects of a country are the changes in the value of assets held abroad, minus the changes in the value of domestic assets held by foreign investors.

The traditional balance of payment identity ignores valuation effects, only recognizes that changes in the net foreign assets (NFA) are fully captured by the current account. The new balance of payment identity, however, considers the role of asset price changes and valuation effects. Changes in the NFA equal the current account plus valuation effects.

$$\begin{align}
\mbox{Change in NFA} & = \mbox{Current Account} +\mbox{Valuation Effects} \\
\end{align}$$

== Valuation effects and the U.S. current account deficits ==
Valuation effects have been increasingly important for the U.S. in the last two decades, given a dramatic, sharp rise in international cross-country portfolio holdings. For the U.S., valuation effects are partly compensating its current account deficits and therefore mitigating the decline of its net foreign assets.

During 1994-2007, the U.S. accumulated more than US$5 trillions in current account deficits. This figure will be rising at least in 2009 and 2010. The phenomenon understandably raises a lot of concerns about the size of the U.S. external debts, because a high, unsustainable external debt can result in painful debt service and/or sharp currency depreciation.

New evidence, however, suggests that while the U.S. has been experiencing large, persistent current account deficits, the assets U.S. investors hold overseas are gaining more in value compared to the value of U.S. assets held by foreign investors. These positive valuation effects represent financial gains for the U.S. (some attribute this phenomenon to exorbitant privilege). Economists at the Federal Reserve estimated that during 1994-2007, the U.S. valuation effects (in stocks and bonds) are about +$1.2 trillion, about 22% of the U.S. total current account deficits,.
