= Global saving glut =

Situation where desired saving exceeds desired investment

A global saving glut (also GSG, cash hoarding, dead cash, dead money, glut of excess intended saving, or shortfall of investment intentions) is a situation in which desired saving (Note: According to Bernanke 2005 national saving is the "sum of saving done by households (for example, through contributions to employer-sponsored pension accounts) and saving done by businesses (in the form of retained earnings) less any budget deficit run by the government (which is a use rather than a source of saving). Government investment in roads or schools, for example, is part of national saving in the national income accounts. National saving is reduced by the government deficit net of government investment, not by the entire government deficit. The difference between domestic investment and national saving is not affected by this qualification, however, as government investment and the implied adjustment to national saving cancel each other out.") exceeds desired investment. By 2005 Ben Bernanke, chairman of the Federal Reserve, the central bank of the United States, expressed concern about the "significant increase in the global supply of saving" and its implications for monetary policies, particularly in the United States. Although Bernanke's analyses focused on events in 2003 to 2007 that led to the 2008 financial crisis, regarding GSG countries and the United States, excessive saving by the non-financial corporate sector (NFCS) is an ongoing phenomenon, affecting many countries. Bernanke's global saving glut (GSG) hypothesis argued that increased capital inflows to the United States from GSG countries (Note: In his 2011 paper Bernanke defined the GSG countries as "all countries of Asia and the Middle East excluding Japan. This group, although not exhaustive, accounts for the lion's share of investment in the United States by emerging market economies.") were an important reason that U.S. longer-term interest rates from 2003 to 2007 were lower than expected.

A 2007 Organisation for Economic Co-operation and Development (OECD) report noted that the "excess of gross saving over fixed investment (i.e. net lending) in the "aggregate OECD corporate sector" had been unusually large since 2002. In a 2006 International Monetary Fund report, it was observed that, "since the bursting of the equity market bubble in the early 2000s, companies in many industrial countries have moved from their traditional position of borrowing funds to finance their capital expenditures to running financial surpluses that they are now lending to other sectors of the economy". David Wessell in a Wall Street Journal article observed that, "[c]ompanies, which normally borrow other folks’ savings in order to invest, have turned thrifty. Even companies enjoying strong profits and cash flow are building cash hoards, reducing debt and buying back their own shares—instead of making investment bets." Although the hypothesis of excess cash holdings or cash hoarding has been used by the OECD, the International Monetary Fund and the media (Wall Street Journal, Forbes, Canadian Broadcasting Corporation), the concept itself has been disputed and criticized as conceptually flawed in articles and reports published by the Hoover Institute, the Max-Planck Institute and the CATO Institute among others. Ben Bernanke used the phrase "global savings glut" in 2005 linking it to the U.S. current account deficit.

In their July 2012 report Standard & Poor's described the "fragile equilibrium that currently exists in the global corporate credit landscape". U.S. NFCS firms continued to hoard a "record amount of cash" with large profitable investment-grade companies and technology and health care industries (with significant amounts of cash overseas), holding most of the wealth.

By January 2013, NFCS firms in Europe had over 1 trillion euros of cash on their balance sheets, a record high in nominal terms.

== History ==
Saving gluts are not a new phenomenon. Economists like Karl Marx, J. A. Hobson and John Maynard Keynes considered the effect of an imbalance between savings and investment on the economy, which for them was caused by an overtly unequal distribution of income and wealth Their underlying thesis is that a principal cause of depression is formed by the inability of capitalists to find sufficient investment opportunities to offset the increasing levels of saving generated by economic growth. The underlying reason is that as money is saved, it is extracted from the economic system or flow, which reduces consumption over time when these funds are not invested again. This in turn reduces production, which further reduces income, which further reduces consumption and leads to a depression, which will be resolved when a new (lower) equilibrium is found.

Plummeting interest rates are a consequence of such a saving glut: as the amount of savings (greatly) increase with decreasing opportunities for investment, interest rates decrease as the supply of savings outstrips its demand.

The authors on saving gluts however differed in their possible solutions. Marx considered it one of the inherent contradictions of capitalism and therefore saw no long-term solution within the system itself. Hobson prescribed income equalization (e.g., through redistributive measures) to reduce savings and re-incentivize the economy.

Keynes proposed that governments could borrow savings when they exceeded investment. The borrowed funds could then be spent on socially useful projects (which should not increase the economy's production capacity or hinder future investment opportunities). This would reduce savings, stimulate the economy and offer new opportunities for investment, while not adding to the capital stock (which would increase production and thus once again reduce investment opportunities). This way, the economy would be revitalized by using overt surpluses for the common good, creating the conditions for renewed economy activity.

When the equity market bubble burst in the early 2000s, companies in many industrial countries reduced borrowing funds to finance their capital expenditures. They began running financial surpluses that they lent to other sectors of the economy. In 2003–2004 the non-financial corporate sector in member nations of the Group of Seven (G-7) held $US 1.3 trillion of corporate excess saving. (Note: The IMF (2006) report used "cash" to refer to "currency and deposits plus short-term securities (including treasury bills, commercial paper, and certificates of deposits).") By 2011 Statistics Canada reported that Canadian business were "sitting on more than $583 billion in Canadian currency and deposits, and more than $276 billion in foreign currency".

During and after the Great Recession of the late 2000s levels of economic and policy uncertainty rose dramatically contributing to the depth of the recession and the weakness of the following recovery with many corporations globally avoiding investments and increasing their cash holdings, in what has been called "liquidity hoarding", "cash hoarding" or "dead cash".

== Cash kings ==
In March 2013 Moody's Investors Service published their report entitled Cash Pile Grows 10% to $1.45 Trillion; Overseas Holdings Continue to Expand in their Global Credit Research series, in which they examined companies they rate in the US non-financial corporate sector (NFCS). According to their report, by the end of 2012 the US NFCS held "$1.45 trillion in cash," 10% more than in 2001. At the end of 2011, US NFCS held $1.32 trillion in cash which was already a record level. "Of the $1.32 trillion for all the rated companies, Moody's estimates that $840 billion, or 58% of the total cash, is held overseas."

By the end of 2012 Apple, Microsoft, Google, Pfizer, and Cisco, "cash kings", as Moody's called them, held $347 billion at the end of 2012 compared to $278 billion in 2011.

At the end of 2012 Ford Motor Company's cash balance was $22.9 billion and was listed as ten on the list of U.S. non-financial corporation sector's top ten cash kings by Moody's Investors Service in their March 2013 annual report on Global Credit Research.

== Causes ==
In his article in April 2013 Federal Reserve Bank Economist, Kevin Kliesen investigated some of the causes of the "recent upsurge in hoarding of cash by firms" or "increased accumulation of cash on corporate balance sheets" in the United States. He suggested a number of valid reasons including "increased levels of economic uncertainty", "increased competition, especially in the information technology sector" and "financing of research and development". Kliesen also argued that another reason for cash hoarding in the U.S. is the "relatively high U.S. corporate tax rate on income generated from foreign operations and subsidiaries".

In an article published in The Economist in 2005, it was argued that the consumer boom was built on the unreliable foundation of rising house prices and that corporations were waiting for housing prices to level off or decline before they are willing to invest rather than save.

== Opportunistic borrowing ==
Financial liabilities have increased at U.S. NFCS firms, suggesting they may be taking advantage of low interests rates, and saving this cash as unused financial assets for future use.

=== Pension deficit ===
In 2005 Bernanke identified a number of possible causes for the global saving glut that began in 2001, including pension funding to make provision for an impending increase in the number of retirees relative to the number of workers. "Dearth of domestic investment opportunities", due to slowly growing or declining work forces, and high capital-labor ratios, which leads to low returns on domestic investment. As a result, the mature industrial economies seek to run current account surpluses and thus to lend abroad.

RBC Global Asset Management's Chief Economist, Eric Lascelles, also argued that NFCS firms were building financial assets as a precautionary measure, claiming that in 2011 "private U.S. defined-benefit pension plans were underfunded by $USD 909 billion", whereas they "were roughly balanced in 2007".

=== Bank-centred governance and non-financial corporations cash holdings ===
At the 1998 International Finance Conference, in their paper entitled Bank Power and Cash Holdings: Evidence from Japan, Pinkowitz and Williamson showed that Japanese firms held more cash than U.S. or German firms. They concluded that the "monopoly power of Japanese banks" persuaded non-financial corporations to hold larger cash balances. "During periods with powerful banks, firms' high cash holdings are consistent with banks extracting rents." When banks weakened, NFCS firms held lower cash levels. Firms might take fewer risks in countries with bank-centered governance but "banks' incentives might not coincide with those of shareholders".

=== Policy uncertainty: environmental and health public policies ===
U.S. NFCS firms' rationale behind increasing cash holdings and restrained capital expenditures is most often linked to policy uncertainty. At the end of 2012 NFCS firms faced "uncertainty regarding economic growth, the fiscal cliff, the debt ceiling, the pursuit of a sustainable long-term fiscal trajectory, health-care reform and financial-sector reform". The Policy Uncertainty Index was elevated at that time.

== Consequences ==
=== A fall in global real long-term interest rates ===
In 2005 J.P. Morgan Chase & Co. observed that the increase in excess saving in the corporate sector contributed to the "relatively low level of global long-term interest rates at a time of a ballooning U.S. current account deficit". Greenspan argued that the excess saving resulted in a "fall in global real long-term interest rates and their associated capitalization rates. Asset prices, particularly house prices, in nearly two dozen countries accordingly moved dramatically higher. U.S. house price gains were high by historical standards but no more than average compared to other countries."

=== Rising global imbalances with respect to international current account balances ===
The United States was already experiencing a dramatic increase in its current account deficit (Note: Bernanke 10 March 2005 explained the U.S. current account deficit equalled the "excess of U.S. payments to foreigners over payments received in a given period." The U.S. current account deficit was c. $635 billion in 2004. The value of U.S. imports exceeded that of exports by c. $618 billion.) Bernanke argued that the GSG caused the rise in current account deficits. A "current account deficit means that a country is spending more than it is producing".

=== Low capital expenditure (capex) ===
Low capital expenditure (capex) is frequently cited as hindering economic recovery although economists are not in agreement on this. Eric Lascelles, explained the rationale behind the surge in corporate saving. He argued that NFCS firms continued to be restrained in terms of capital expenditure for a variety of reasons. Equipment and software prices have dropped since 1992 allowing them to purchase more with less. In the United States, there is an oversupply of capital stock which includes physical capital, office space, plants and equipment in the U.S. Existing capital is not depreciating rapidly and firms are running under capacity. NFCS firms began deleveraging after the 2008 financial crisis as they found that their assets were "worth less than they imagined and discovered that continuous access to debt markets was not guaranteed". They channeled resources to the financial account and asset liquidity, away from capital expenditures.

In 2013 Gareth Williams, Director, Sector Economist at Standard & Poor's argued that a "large and growing share of European corporate capex was directed to emerging markets" outside of Europe, "up 42% from January 2012 and up from 28% from 2007". Williams claims there is "a strong precautionary motive in the amount of cash being held" by NFCS firms, in the eurozone European Economic and Monetary Union which is "trapped in a quagmire of austerity, high unemployment, and political uncertainty".

=== Developing countries became net lenders on capital markets ===
Developing countries became net lenders on capital markets. United States and other advanced economies became net borrowers. University of California, Berkeley economist Obstfeld observed, that Bernanke and other proponents of the global saving glut account of the 2007–09 crisis argued that large surpluses by China (and other GSG countries) had adverse effects on richer countries' current accounts and financial markets. To avoid the consequences of financial crises, developing countries built up "war chests" of large quantities of foreign-exchange reserves to act as a buffer against potential capital outflows during financial crises.

According to Bernanke the US was attractive for foreign investors because of new technologies and rising productivity. Capital flowing into the United States increased the value of the dollar making the imports of the US cheap (in terms of dollars) and exports expensive (in terms of foreign currencies), creating a rising US current account deficit. GSG countries accumulated reserves in the "context of foreign exchange interventions intended to promote export-led growth by preventing exchange-rate appreciation".(sometimes called Bretton Woods II).

== The Lucas paradox ==
In Robert Lucas' classical paradox described in the article entitled "Why doesn't capital flow from rich to poor countries?" and published in 1990 in the American Economic Review, Lucas questioned the validity of the assumptions of the neoclassical model that gave rise to differences in the marginal product of capital. For example, in 1988 in India, a poorer country at that time, the marginal product of capital should have been 58 greater than in the United States, a richer nation. Lucas did not observe such flows. Lucas argued that the central question of economic development should be to replace these assumptions.

The integration of emerging markets into the global financial system has been characterized by cyclical periods of capital inflows, interrupted by sudden capital outflows and financial crises. Probably the most renowned boom-and-bust cycle was the surge of private capital flows to emerging markets during the 90's that ended with a succession of crises, starting with Mexico in 1995 and then touching East Asian countries in 1997–1998, Russia in 1998, Brazil in 1999, Argentina and Turkey in 2001. The following boom to emerging markets during the 2000s was again interrupted by a sudden reversal of capital flows during the 2008 financial crisis following the bankruptcy of Lehman Brothers. Since 2009, capital flows to emerging markets are again at historical heights. This highly cyclical nature of capital flows and the increased frequency of financial crashes have cast questions about the process of financial globalisation—i.e. the dramatic expansion of international financial transactions over the past twenty-thirty years—and holdings itself.

— Bonizzi, 2013, 3

== Canada ==
The Canadian government introduced business incentives along with corporate tax reductions "to compel Canadian corporations to invest some $525 billion of dead cash back into the economy". In their analysis of the 2012 budget the Canadian Labour Congress argued that "non-financial corporations" have used their federal incentives and tax cuts (Note: Prior to 2007, the federal corporate income tax rate was over 20%. Since 2007 the corporate tax rate was lowered. Bay 2012 it was 15%.) to "buy up their own shares, to increase dividends, and to increase their cash holdings" which amounted to "close to $500 billion of surplus cash" that they were not investing in job creation.

In August 2012 then Bank of Canada Governor Mark Carney "castigated corporations in Canada for their high levels of savings, saying firms should either spend their ample financial reserves or return the value to shareholders through buy-backs". Financial Post journalist Philip Cross argued that "It is the job of companies to make money for their shareholders, not to put money to work." Cross also argued that, "If households and governments are net borrowers, inevitably firms must be net lenders, which require savings." From 2002 to 2012, corporations in Germany, the UK and Japan had higher savings rates than corporations in Canada. After the Great Recession corporations in OECD member nations further increased their savings rates.

Don Drummond, who was formerly the chief economist for TD Bank, argued that reluctance of Canadian businesses to invest capital is a problematic, long term pattern. It is not because of "excessive prudence". By spring 2013 in Canada "the stock of machinery and equipment per worker" in average "was between 50% and 60%" of what it was in the United States. The lack of spending was long term and it continued through 2012 while in the United States spending increased. Drummond argued that this gap would get bigger. According to Drummond, there was a time when Canadian businesses spent less because of "factors such as tax rates and the dollar, but if that were ever true it's certainly not anymore... Canadian businesses are accustomed to operating in an environment that is sheltered from competition, compared to the American business climate. As a result, they don't accurately perceive the risks of being too cautious, and of failing to exploit opportunities and available resources."

== Criticism ==
This view of a worldwide saving glut responsible for low levels of interest rates is disputed by neoclassical economists like the German economist Hans-Werner Sinn, who claims that it was the monetary policy of the US Federal Reserve in the 1990s which kept interest rates too low for too long. In addition, the policy of the US government encouraged private debt to promote private consumption. This led to a lack of savings in the US which was then provided from foreign countries on a basis which was not sustainable. Carl Christian von Weizsäcker follows Ben Bernanke claiming that aging populations which save more than can be profitably invested lead to a saving glut and negative equilibrium rates of interest which makes public deficits necessary to fill the gap between excess private savings and private investment.

From the perspective of monetary economics, the savings glut idea has been criticized as conceptually flawed, ignoring the role of credit creation, and related unsustainable asset price booms. Further, the composition of cross-border financing flows cannot be determined just from the net capital flows, and analysis on this basis yields flawed conclusions.

In his 2008 article entitled "Competing Explanations: A Global Saving Glut", Senior Fellow in Economics at Stanford University's Hoover Institution, John B. Taylor, stated that there was "no evidence for a global saving glut". Using an International Monetary Fund 2005 graph, he argued that "the global saving rate—world saving as a fraction of world GDP—was very low in the 2002–2004 period especially when compared with the 1970s and 1980s".

According to Taylor, "[T]here was a gap of saving over investment in the world outside the United States during 2002–2004, and this may be the source of the term "saving glut". But the United States was saving less than it was investing during this period; it was running a current account deficit which implies that saving was less than investment. Thus the positive saving gap outside the United States was offset by an equal sized negative saving gap in the United States. No extra impact on world interest rates would be expected. As implied by simple global accounting, there is no global gap between saving and investment."

Taylor argued that the global gross savings rate (not necessarily the net savings rate) during the 2000s was slightly higher than savings rate in the 80s or 90s according to IMF data.

Niall Ferguson in The Ascent of Money, published in 2008, examines the long history of money, credit, and banking. In it he predicted a financial crisis as a result of the world economy and in particular the United States using too much credit. Specifically he cites the China–America dynamic which he refers to as Chimerica where an Asian "savings glut" helped create the subprime mortgage crisis with an influx of easy money.

Thomas Mayer and Gunther Schnabl argue that the Keynesian economic theory widely omits the banking sector, and therefore interest rate changes by central banks have a direct impact on investments. In contrast, in the Austrian economic theory the banking sector plays a crucial role for transmission of monetary policy. Low interest rates could lead to malinvestment and speculative exuberance on financial markets, which can impair long-term growth. Mayer and Schnabl find no empirical evidence for the savings glut hypothesis nor for the secular stagnation hypothesis. Instead, low growth is explained by the emergence of quasi "soft budget constraints" resulting from low interest rates that reduce the incentive for banks and firms to strive for efficiency (zombification).

== See also ==
- Global imbalances
- The Paradox of thrift
- Saving-investment balance
