= Invisible balance =

The invisible balance or balance of trade on services is that part of the balance of trade that refers to services and other items that do not result in the transfer of physical objects. Examples include consulting services, shipping services, tourism, and patent license revenues. This figure is usually generated by tertiary industry. The term 'invisible balance' is especially common in the United Kingdom.

For countries that rely on service exports or on tourism, the invisible balance is particularly important. For instance the United Kingdom and Saudi Arabia receive significant international income from financial services, while Japan and Germany rely more on exports of manufactured goods.

== Types of invisibles ==
Invisibles are both international payments for services (as opposed to goods), as well as movements of money without exchange for goods or services. These invisibles are called 'transfer payments' or 'remittances' and may include money sent from one country to another by an individual, business, government or non-governmental organisations (NGO) – often charities.

An individual remittance may include money sent to a relative overseas. Business transfers may include profits sent by a foreign subsidiary to a parent company or money invested by a business in a foreign country. Bank loans to foreign countries are also included in this category, as are license fees paid for the use of patents and trademarks. Government transfers may involve loans made or official aid given to foreign countries, while transfers made by NGO's include money designated for charitable work within foreign countries, respectively.

== Balance of payments and invisibles ==
In many countries a useful distinction is drawn between the balance of trade and the balance of payments. 'Balance of trade' refers to the trade of both tangible (physical) objects as well as the trade in services – collectively known as exports and imports (in other words, 'visibles plus services') – while the 'balance of payments' also includes transfers of Capital in the form of loans, investments in shares or direct investment in projects.

A nation may have a visibles balance surplus but this can be offset by a larger deficit in the invisibles balance (creating a Balance of Trade deficit overall) – if, for example, there are large payments made to foreign businesses for invisibles such as shipping or tourism. On the other hand, a Visibles Balance deficit can be offset by a strong surplus on the invisibles balance if, for example, foreign aid is being provided.

In a similar way, a nation may also have a surplus 'balance of trade' because it exports more than it imports but a negative (or deficit) 'balance of payments' because, it has a much greater shortfall in transfers of capital. And, just as easily, a deficit in the 'balance of trade' may be offset by a larger surplus in capital transfers from overseas to produce a balance of payments surplus overall.

== Balance of payments problems and the invisible balance ==
Problems with a country's balance of trade (or balance of payments) are often associated with an inappropriate valuation of its currency, its country's foreign exchange rate.

If a country's exchange rate is too high, its exports will become uncompetitive as buyers in foreign countries require more of their own currency to pay for them. In the meantime, it also becomes cheaper for the citizens of the country to buy goods from overseas, as opposed to buying locally produced goods), because an overvalued currency makes foreign products less expensive.

The simultaneous decline in currency inflows from decreased exports and the rise in outflows, due to increased imports, sends the balance of trade into deficit, which then needs to be paid for by a transfer of funds in some form, either invisible transfers (aid, etc.) or capital flows (loans, etc.). However, relying on funds like that to support a trade deficit, is unsustainable, and the country may eventually require its currency to be devalued.

If, on the other hand, a currency is undervalued, its exports will become cheaper and therefore more competitive internationally. At the same time, imports will also become more costly, stimulating the production of domestic substitutes to replace them. That will result in a growth of currency flowing into the country and a decline in currency flowing out of it, resulting in an improvement in the country's balance of trade.

Because a nation's exchange rate has a big impact on its 'balance of trade' and its 'balance of payments', many economists favour freely floating exchange rates over the older, fixed (or pegged) rates of foreign currency exchange. Floating exchange rates allow more regular adjustments in exchange rates to occur, allowing the greater opportunity for international payments to maintain equilibrium.
