= Net foreign assets =

In economics, the concept of net foreign assets relates to balance of payments identity.

The net foreign asset (NFA) position of a country is the value of its net claims on the rest of the world (RoW), i.e. the value of the assets that country owns abroad, minus the value of the domestic assets owned by foreigners:

$$\mbox{NFA} = \mbox{Assets} - \mbox{Liabilities}$$

The net foreign asset position of a country reflects the indebtedness of that country.

== The traditional balance of payments identity ==
Traditional balance-of-payments accounting is that the change in the net foreign asset position equals the current account balance. In other words, if a country runs a $700 billion current account deficit, it has to borrow exactly $700 billion from abroad to finance the deficit and therefore, the country's net foreign asset position falls by $700 billion.

$$\mbox{Change in NFA} = \mbox{Current Account}$$

== The augmented balance of payments identity ==
The traditional balance of payments identity does not take into account changes in asset prices and exchange rates. For example, the value of external assets or liabilities can change due to higher or lower stockmarket prices or a default/write-off on debt. Similarly, changes in exchange rates will affect the value of foreign assets and liabilities. An appreciation of a country's currency will decrease both the value of assets denominated in foreign currency and the burden of liabilities denominated in foreign currency. The value of assets and liabilities denominated in the home currency will not be affected by changes in the exchange rate.

Suppose the same country has some assets it owns abroad, and the value of these assets appreciates by $700 billion. The appreciation of asset prices, referred to as "positive valuation effects" in this case exactly offsets the current account deficit. At the end of the day, the country's net foreign asset position remains unchanged, despite the $700 billion current account deficit.

The effect will be the same if the value of the country's external liabilities falls by $700 billion, or the gains in value of its foreign assets minus the gains in value of its liabilities is $700 billion.

The net foreign asset position equals the current account plus valuation effects:

$$\mbox{Change in NFA} = \mbox{Current Account} +\mbox{Valuation Effects}$$

== See also ==
- Net international investment position
