= Life settlement =

Life settlement of a life insurance contract

A life settlement or viatical settlement (from Latin viaticum, something received before death) is the sale of an existing life insurance policy (typically of seniors) for more than its cash surrender value, but less than its net death benefit, to a third party investor. Such a sale provides the policy owner with a lump sum. The third party becomes the new owner of the policy, pays the monthly premiums, and receives the full benefit of the policy when the insured dies.

In many jurisdictions, a viatical is a life settlement where the insured has less than two-year life expectancy. However, some jurisdictions, such as the U.S. state of Maryland, use the term viatical settlement for both types.

== Description ==
Term, permanent, or whole life insurance policies qualify for life settlement. Most commonly, universal life insurance policies are sold. Policyholders are generally 65 or older and own a life insurance policy worth $100,000 or more.

Policyholders may enter into life settlements, among other reasons, because they can no longer afford the ongoing premiums, they no longer need or want the policy, to fund long-term care, increased medical costs, or they need money for other expenses. Viatical settlements are often sold by, or on behalf of, an insured who is terminally or chronically ill. The policyholder may receive three to five times more than the surrender value for the policy.

The transaction may also be structured as a death benefit transaction, in which policyholders receive cash payments and their beneficiaries also receive a payment after the death of the life insured. After the transaction, the policyholder will no longer have obligations to pay premium.

== Life settlement history ==
=== Grigsby v. Russell (1911) ===
The U.S. Supreme Court case of Grigsby v. Russell, 222 U.S. 149 (1911) established and legitimized the sale of the right to receive life insurance benefits, ruling that a policy was private property which may be assigned at the will of the owner. The case was argued in November 1911 and decided on December 4, 1911. Justice Oliver Wendell Holmes noted in his opinion that life insurance possessed all the ordinary characteristics of property, and therefore represented an asset that a policy owner may transfer without limitation.

Dr. A. H. Grigsby treated a patient named John C. Burchard. Burchard was unable to pay for a needed operation but had an insurance policy on his life, being in need of a particular surgical operation, offered to sell Dr. Grigsby his life insurance policy in return for $100. Grigsby would pay the remaining premiums. When Mr. Burchard died, Dr. Grigsby attempted to collect the benefits. An executor of Burchard's estate challenged Dr. Grigsby in Appeals Court and won. The case eventually reached the U.S. Supreme Court where Justice Oliver Wendell Holmes Jr. delivered the opinion of the court. He stated in relevant part that

So far as reasonable safety permits, it is desirable to give to life policies the ordinary characteristics of property. To deny the right to sell except to persons having such an interest is to diminish appreciably the value of the contract in the owner's hands.

The Supreme Court's decision set forth the fundamental principle upon which the viatical settlement and later, the life settlement industry were based: a life insurance policy is private property, which can be assigned at the will of the owner. However, viatical settlements remained rare for almost eight decades until the onset of the AIDS epidemic.

=== 1980s–1999 ===
Despite the Supreme Court ruling, life settlements remained extremely uncommon due to lack of awareness from policy holders and lack of interest from potential investors. That changed in the 1980s when the U.S. faced an AIDS epidemic. The early victims of AIDS in the U.S. were largely gay men, typically relatively young and without wives or children (the traditional beneficiaries under a life insurance policy), but often covered by life insurance through employment or as a result of investments. The beneficiaries under the policies were often their parents who did not need the money. Viatical settlements offered a way to extract value from the policy while the policy owner was still alive.

At the time, the AIDS mortality rate was very high, and life expectancy after diagnosis was typically short. Investors were reasonably sure that they would collect in a relatively short time. As medical advancements improved the lives of those persons living with terminal or chronic illnesses, the life settlement industry emerged.

However, by the mid-1990s, this investment strategy had faded away because of the rise of antiviral drugs.

In its place arose a new strategy focusing on acquiring policies of the elderly, although a niche business persists to this day acquiring policies on terminally ill of all ages. Policies of terminally ill patients are rare for two key reasons. First, the market size of terminally ill insured interested in selling their policies is small. Second, carriers now offer accelerated death benefit riders, which pay out if the insured is terminally ill, so there is no need for a settlement.

In 1993, the National Association of Insurance Commissioners (NAIC) adopted the first Viatical Settlement Model Act. The term "viatical settlement" refers to a life settlement where the life expectancy is under two years because the person is terminally ill.

=== 2000–present ===
In 2000, the National Conference of Insurance Legislators (NCOIL) adopted the Life Settlements Model Act. In 2001, "life settlements" became a common term to describe the purchase of life insurance policies from senior citizens.

In 2005, the life settlement industry was regulated in twenty-five states, providing seniors more value than the cash surrender option.

In 2007, the NAIC and NAIC adopted revisions to the Viatical Settlements Model Act and the Life Settlements Model Act to strengthen consumer protections and address STOLI (stranger-originated life insurance) concerns.

In 2010, NCOIL adopted the Life Insurance Consumers Disclosure Model Act.

Early improper activities among a few bad actors produced a fear among consumers regarding viatical settlements. Life insurers became concerned about individuals purchasing policies purely for speculative purposes. Many US states regulate viatical and life settlements and many more are developing legislation and regulations. As of June 2011, the only states that do not regulate viatical settlements are Wyoming, South Dakota, Missouri, Alabama, and South Carolina.

Following the Tax Cuts and Jobs Act of 2017, proceeds up to the total amount of premiums paid over time are tax free, and proceeds more than the tax basis up to the amount of the policy's surrender value are taxed as ordinary income. Proceeds in excess of the surrender value are taxed as capital gains.

In 2020, the Senior Health Planning Account Act (HR 5958) was introduced in the U.S. House of Representatives. It would allow seniors to pay for health care costs using tax-exempt proceeds from the sale of their life insurance. It was reintroduced in 2021.

According to a 2023 study by a life settlement industry group, policyholders received approximately $842 million through life settlement transactions, representing $707 million in additional value compared to policy lapses or insurer surrenders.

== Market size ==
Life settlements remain a niche asset class. For the year ending 2020, according to the Life Settlement Report by the Deal, there were 3,241 policies purchased with a total face value of $4.6B on the secondary market (from the original policyowner). This was up from 2019 when 2,878 policies for a total face value of $4.4B were purchased on the secondary market. In contrast, as of 2018, there were 267M life insurance policies in force in the United States.

Moreover, it is estimated that roughly 10M policies a year lapse. Since policyowners receive more money by selling, not lapsing, many believe the life settlement market will continue to grow.

== Major trends ==
There are major industry trends. One is the rise in asset capital. More institutional investors are funding life settlements and have invested billions of dollars in assets since the early 2000s. For reference, in the primary market, insurance companies sell life insurance policies to market individuals, who become policyowners. In the secondary market, policyowners' policies are sold to third parties such as life settlement providers, who purchase policies on behalf of third party investors such as institutional investors. In the tertiary market, third party investors trade policies, which are included in the asset class.

Another major trend is direct-to-consumer marketing. Some providers and brokers engage in advertising to raise awareness of the life settlement option. This allows policy owners an easy way to engage directly with providers and brokers. By working directly with a provider or a broker, policy owners are not submitting through a financial advisor or other professional.

Life settlement technology surrounding apis, apps and AI continue to improve the industries transparency for consumers.

The final trend is more efficient medical underwriting. It is the result of new technologies and more reliable data from systems that are utilizing prescription and clinical database searches. While the market for life expectancy companies has grown more competitive, managers have become more adept with analytics and are better able to estimate more accurate life expectancies for life settlement transactions. This mitigates the risk of serious financial losses heightened by prior underwriting methodologies and increases profitability and investor demand for policies.

== Transaction parties ==
- Policyowner or policyholder - The party who owns the insurance policy
- Insured - Person(s) whose life is tied to the policy
- Financial advisor - Advisor to the policyowner
- Life settlement broker - Company that shops policies to life settlement providers
- Life settlement provider - A company that is licensed by state insurance departments to purchase life insurance policies from policyowners
- Investor - Institutions that purchase pools of policies from life settlement providers

A policyowner or the insured may contact a life settlement provider, financial advisor, or life settlement broker regarding the sale of a life insurance policy. Financial advisors may use life settlement brokers to access life settlement providers, or they may go directly to life settlement providers. Financial advisors and life settlement brokers represent the policyowner regarding the sale of a life insurance policy. Life settlement providers purchase policies and either retain ownership of those policies, or they sell pools of policies to institutional investors. Expected returns for the buyer range from 8 to 10 per cent after fees.

Until 2022, one of the largest life settlement providers was GWG, which purchased over $3 billion of life settlements. However, GWG declared bankruptcy in 2022, and it has subsequently come under scrutiny by regulators, journalists, and attorneys who say it inappropriately marketed its investments to mom-and-pop investors. As of 2025, the largest buyers in the U.S. are Coventry Direct and Abacus Life. The number of life settlement providers (buyers) is growing, with 22 licensed in California alone.

== Transaction process ==
In a life settlement transaction, the insured completes an application. Once they receive a formal offer from a life settlement provider, the insured receives a “closing” package containing documents to formalize their acceptance of the life settlement exchange offer. The client signs transfer-of-ownership forms to complete the transaction.

== Regulation ==
Forty three states, approximately 90% of the United States population, is regulated by life settlement laws. However, New Mexico and Michigan only regulate viatical settlements, while Wyoming, South Dakota, Missouri, Alabama, and South Carolina, and Washington, D.C. neither regulate viatical settlements nor life settlements. However, some states, like Maryland, refer to any life settlement as a viatical settlement.

The Life Insurance Settlement Association (LISA) is a nonprofit created in 1994 to promote legislation and regulation in the industry. Members include brokers, providers, investors, and others. The association annually awards the Alan H. Buerger (AHB) award for Industry Leadership.

The Institutional Longevity Markets Association, Inc. (ILMA) is a trade association formed to regulate the life settlement and longevity marketplace.

The European Life Settlement Association (ELSA) represents European investors, service providers and intermediaries. Founded in 2009, it sets standards for the European life settlement industry.

== Valuation techniques ==
Life settlements are valued by examining market prices according to the ‘fair value’ approach using closed life settlement transactions. Market data is collected from multiple providers and that information is available to clients as well as third parties. The pricing of life settlements relies on the quantification of two main variables: the insured's life expectancy and the internal rate of return (which reflects the heightened risk associated with life settlements compared to other assets). The actuarial literature presents various approaches to pricing life settlements, including deterministic, probabilistic, stochastic, and fuzzy methods. The sensitivity of the price of a life settlement to variations in the value of the variables on which it depends (insured’s life expectancy and interest rate) can be determined through two different measures, duration and convexity.

Viatical settlements are valued by examining market prices according to the ‘fair value’ approach using closed life settlement transactions. Market data is collected from multiple providers and that information is available to clients as well as third parties. The pricing of life settlements relies on the quantification of two main variables: the insured's life expectancy and the internal rate of return (which reflects the heightened risk associated with life settlements compared to other assets). The actuarial literature presents various approaches to pricing life settlements, including deterministic, probabilistic, stochastic, and fuzzy methods. The sensitivity of the price of a life settlement to variations in the value of the variables on which it depends (insured’s life expectancy and interest rate) can be determined through two different measures, duration and convexity.

== Major study findings ==
An academic study that showed some of the potential of the life settlement market was conducted in 2002 by the University of Pennsylvania business school, the Wharton School. The research papers, credited to Neil Doherty and Hal Singer, were released under the title The Benefits of a Secondary Market For Life Insurance. This study found, among other things, that life settlement providers paid approximately $340 million to consumers for their under-performing life insurance policies, an opportunity that was not available to them just a few years before.

A 2002 study showed that among hospice financial counselors who have had experience with viatical settlements, most report positive experiences.

In 2016, the University of Pennsylvania's Wharton Business School and Washington University’s Olin Business School conducted another academic study. The study found that the majority of life insurance policies do not pay a death benefit, with nearly 85 percent of term policies and 88 percent of universal life policies failing to pay a death claim.

Another study by Conning & Co. Research, Life Settlements: Additional Pressure on Life Profits, found that senior citizens owned approximately $500 billion worth of life insurance in 2003, of which $100 billion was owned by seniors eligible for life settlements.

A life insurance industry-sponsored study by Deloitte Consulting and the University of Connecticut came to negative conclusions regarding the life settlement market.

A 2013 study found that a life settlement, on average, delivered four times what policy owners would have received had they surrendered their policies to a life insurance company.

In 2020, the amount paid to sellers increased from $839.6 million to $848.1 million.

== Notable cases ==
=== Mutual Benefits ===
One of the most infamous viaticals cases involved the Mutual Benefits Corporation headed by Peter Lombardi and run by Joel Steinger. The Florida company purchased life insurance policies from people with HIV, and sold shares in the future proceeds to 28,000 investors. In 2004, the Securities and Exchange Commission closed the firm saying it was a $1 billion Ponzi scheme. Lombardi and Steinger received 20-year prison sentences.

=== Kelco ===
In August 2008, Stephen L. Keller, the former CEO of Kelco Inc., filed a motion in the United States District Court for the Eastern District of Kentucky, with Judge Karl S. Forester, to dismiss Keller's convictions for conspiracy, fraud, and money laundering. Keller's convictions resulted from Kelco buying and selling life insurance policies that in some cases, had been falsified by 3rd party insurance agents, for insureds with HIV/AIDS applications, then buying the policies in a viatical settlement. Keller's motion was denied on November 12, 2010. His appeal of that denial was also denied, on February 28, 2011.

== See also ==
- Death bond
