= IntelliQuote Insurance Services =

- Company type: Private
- Industry: Insurance
- Founded: 1997; 29 years ago
- Founder: Gary Lardy
- Headquarters: El Dorado Hills, California
- Products: Term Life Insurance, Permanent Life Insurance, Universal Life Insurance, Variable Universal Life Insurance
- Website: Official website

IntelliQuote Insurance Services is an American online life insurance agency. Originally headquartered out of the founder's Folsom, California home, Intelliquote is now in El Dorado Hills, California.

== Founding and development ==
Founded in 1997 by president and CEO Gary Lardy, IntelliQuote was one of the first online life insurance agencies. In its second year, IntelliQuote began expanding business operations and by 2000 had 17 employees. In the year following the company's 2002 incorporation, IntelliQuote placed over 10,000 policies, becoming one of the largest online life insurance agencies.

== Products ==
- Term life insurance
- Permanent life insurance
- Universal life (UL) insurance

== Awards and recognitions ==
In 2004, IntelliQuote was awarded the Transamerica Corporation Leading New General Agency Award. In 2006, IntelliQuote was featured in Forbes Magazine's Best of the Web, and was awarded Prudential Financial's Rock Solid Performer Award.

== Advertising ==
IntelliQuote's consumer outreach and advertising have primarily focused on electronic communication such as social media. In 2013 the company introduced a social media campaign on its corporate blog called the "Everyday Superhero" campaign, featuring a young boy donning a cape and suggesting that there is a hero in everyone.

== Associations ==
- Member Company of the LIFE Foundation
- Charter Member of the Life Insurance Direct Marketers Association

== Key Staff ==
- Carey Wolf, Vice President of Sales
