= Terminal illness insurance =

Terminal illness insurance (known as accelerated death benefit in North America) pays out a capital sum if the policyholder is diagnosed with a terminal illness from which the policyholder is expected to die within 12 months of diagnosis by a physician who specializes in that illness or condition. If the policy holder lives longer than 12 months, he still keeps the payout.

Terminal illness insurance is often added to a life insurance policy or a mortgage life insurance policy by the insurance company issuing the policy. It is not available as a separate insurance policy.

If a life insurance policyholder also has terminal illness insurance, then they have the benefit of knowing that if they are diagnosed with a serious illness and are expected to die within 12 months of diagnosis, then the combined policy will pay out immediately rather than waiting for the policyholder to die (as would happen if the policyholder did not have terminal illness insurance).

It should not be confused with critical illness insurance. The two forms of insurance are different.

== See also ==
- Family income benefit insurance
