= Segregated fund =

Type of investment fund in Canada

A segregated fund or seg fund is a type of investment fund administered by Canadian insurance companies in the form of individual, variable life insurance contracts offering certain guarantees to the policyholder such as reimbursement of capital upon death. As required by law, these funds are fully segregated from the company's general investment funds, hence the name. A segregated fund is analogous to the U.S. insurance industry "separate account" and related insurance and annuity products.

== Usage ==
A segregated fund is an investment fund that combines the growth potential of a mutual fund with the security of a life insurance policy. Segregated funds are often referred to as "mutual funds with an insurance policy wrapper".

Like mutual funds, segregated funds consist of a pool of investments in securities such as bonds, debentures, and stocks. The value of the segregated fund fluctuates according to the market value of the underlying securities.

Segregated funds do not issue units or shares; therefore, a segregated fund investor is not referred to as a unitholder. Instead, the investor is the holder of a segregated fund contract. Contracts can be registered (held inside an RRSP or TFSA) or non-registered (not held inside an RRSP or TFSA). Registered investments qualify for annual tax-sheltered RRSP or TFSA contributions. Non-registered investments are subject to tax payments on the capital gains each year and capital losses can also be claimed.

== Features ==
=== Insurance Contracts ===
Segregated funds are sold as deferred variable annuity contracts and can be sold only by licensed insurance representatives. Segregated funds are owned by the life insurance company, not the individual investors, and must be kept separate (or "segregated") from the company’s other assets. Segregated funds are made up of underlying assets that are purchased via the Life assurance companies. Investors do not have ownership share. Segregated Funds have guarantees and run for a period. Should the investor leave before the end date, he/she may be penalized.

=== Maturity dates ===
All segregated fund contracts have maturity dates, which are not to be confused with maturity guarantees (outlined below). The maturity date is the date at which the maturity guarantee is available to the contract holder. Holding periods to reach maturity are usually 10 or more years.

=== Maturity & death guarantees ===
Guarantee amounts are offered in all segregated funds whereby no less than a certain percentage of the initial investment in a contract (usually 75% or higher) will be paid out at death or contract maturity. In either case, the annuitant or their beneficiary will receive the greater of the guarantee or the investment’s current market value

=== Potential creditor protection ===
Granted certain qualifications are met, segregated fund investments may be protected from seizure from creditors. This is an important feature for business owners or professionals whose assets may have a high exposure to creditors. Creditor protection for Registered Education Savings Plans (RESPs) is generally not available, except in Alberta.

=== Probate protection ===
If a beneficiary is named, the segregated fund investment may be exempt from probate and executor’s fees and pass directly to the beneficiary. If the named beneficiary is a family member (such as a spouse, child, or parent), the investment may also be secure from creditors in case of bankruptcy. These protections apply to both registered and non-registered investments.

=== Reset option ===
A reset option allows the contract holder to lock in investment gains if the market value of a segregated fund contract increases. This resets the contract’s deposit value to equal the greater of the deposit value or current market value, restarts the contract term, and extends the maturity date. Contract holders are limited to a certain number of resets, usually one or two, in a given calendar year.

=== Cost of the guarantees ===
The shorter the term of the maturity guarantees on investment funds - whether they are segregated funds or protected mutual funds - the higher the risk exposure of the insurer and the cost of the guarantees. This inverse relationship is based on the premise that there is a greater chance of market decline (and hence a greater chance of collecting on a guarantee) over shorter periods. A contract holder's use of reset provisions also contributes to costs, since resetting the guaranteed amount at a higher level means that the issuer will be liable for this higher amount.

== See also ==
- Life insurance
- Universal life insurance
- Variable universal life insurance
- Unitised insurance fund
