= Horace Mann Educators Corporation =

American insurance and financial services company

- Type: Public company
- Traded as: NYSE: HMN; S&P 600 component
- Industry: Insurance; Financial services
- Founded: 1945; 81 years ago
- Founder: Leslie Nimmo and Carrol Hall
- Headquarters: Springfield, Illinois, U.S.
- Area served: Springfield, Illinois; Irving, Texas; Morrisville, North Carolina
- Key people: Marita Zuraitis (CEO)
- Services: auto insurance property insurance life insurance financial services
- Number of employees: 1,400
- Website: www.horacemann.com

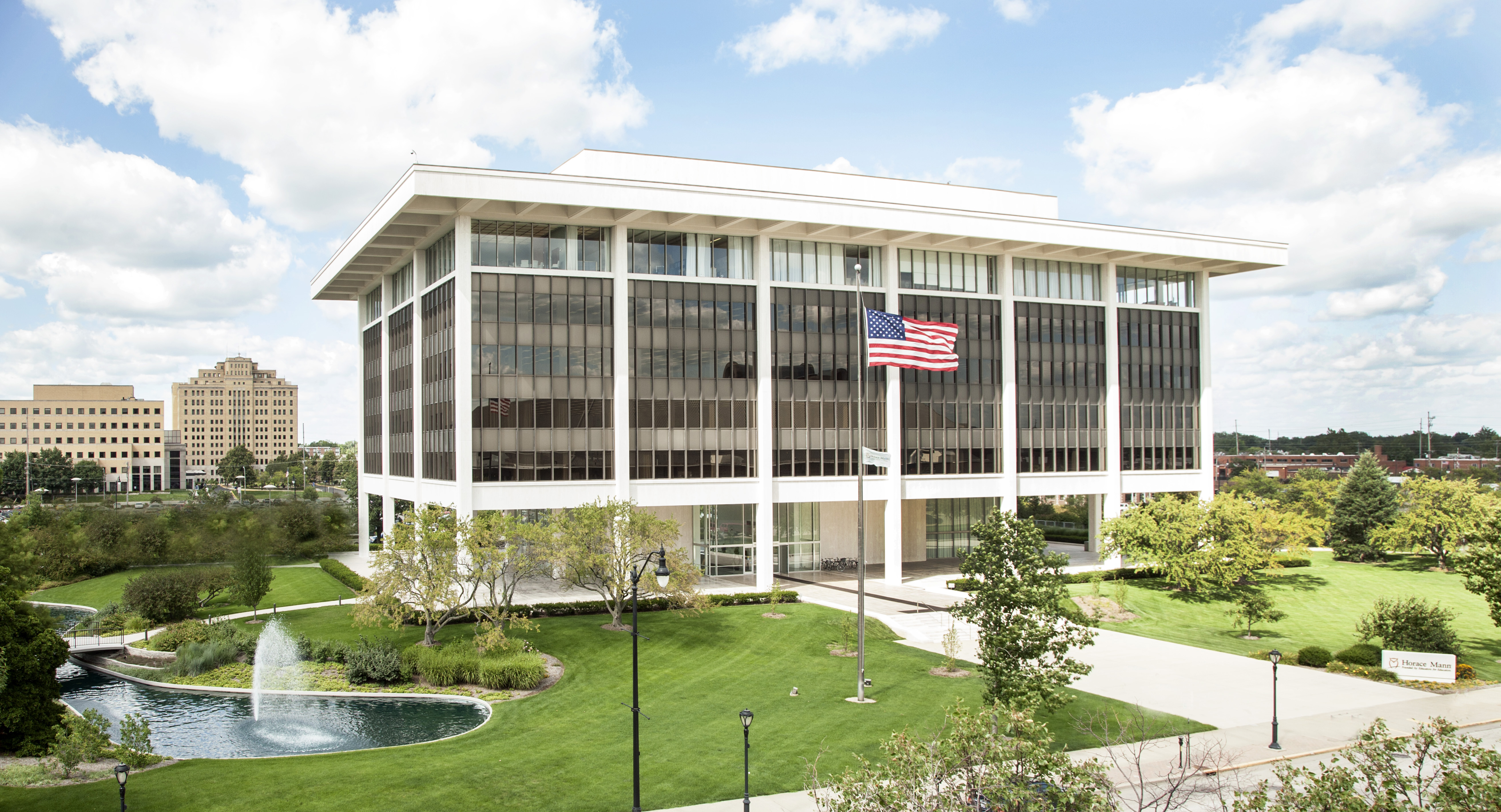
Horace Mann Headquarters in downtown Springfield, Illinois.

Horace Mann is an Illinois-based auto, property, supplemental and life insurance, as well as financial services company that focuses on retirement annuities and mutual funds. Horace Mann primarily works with educators and their families.

== History ==
Horace Mann was founded in Springfield, Illinois, in 1945. Originally named the IEA (Illinois Education Association) Mutual Insurance Company because of its affiliation with the Illinois Education Association, Horace Mann was founded by teachers Leslie Nimmo and Carrol Hall. Nimmo and Carroll created IEA Mutual to sell automotive insurance to Illinois teachers. The company was later renamed Horace Mann, after the American educational reformer of the same name. Mann himself was not involved with the company. In 1947, Horace Mann began to sell insurance policies outside of Illinois and in 1949, the Horace Mann Life Insurance Company was founded. Horace Mann would later add property insurance. In 1961, the company began selling tax-deferred annuities, and in 2003, it entered the mutual funds business. In 1974, the Insurance Company of North America (INA), a Philadelphia-based insurance and financial services corporation, began increasing its holdings of Horace Mann and by January 1975 had acquired the company. In 1982, INA Corporation merged with Connecticut General Corporation, forming a new holding company known as CIGNA.

In August 1989, Horace Mann was acquired from CIGNA by an investor group that included company management. In November 1991, Horace Mann completed an initial public offering of common stock at $18 per share. It is traded on the New York Stock Exchange as HMN. In January 1994, Horace Mann acquired Allegiance Insurance Company, a California property/casualty company. Horace Mann had managed Allegiance Insurance Company since 1989. Allegiance Insurance Company changed its name to Horace Mann Property & Casualty Insurance Company effective March 19, 2001. Marita Zuraitis has been the Director, President and CEO of the company since 2013. Horace Mann’s corporate headquarters in Springfield, Illinois, reside in a building designed by architect Minoru Yamasaki. Horace Mann has regional claim offices in Irving, Texas, and Morrisville, North Carolina. It contracts with more than 600 exclusive agencies for sales and service. Horace Mann has approximately 1,400 employees, including about 1,100 at its Springfield, Illinois headquarters.

In January 2022, Horace Mann announced it had completed the acquisition of Madison National Life Insurance Company, Inc. - a provider of group life, disability and specialty health insurance for educators and public sector employees. The purchase was initially announced in July 2021.

== Insurance policies and services ==
Horace Mann sells personal property and casualty (P&C) insurance, including auto, homeowner, renters, and umbrella insurance. In addition to P&C insurance, Horace Mann provides whole life insurance, term life insurance, universal life insurance, variable universal life insurance, and indexed universal life insurance. Since the 1960s, Horace Mann has sold tax-deferred annuities to teachers for use in 403(b) plans. They continue to sell annuities, both individually and to groups. In addition, Horace Mann provides mutual funds through its limited broker-dealer affiliate, Horace Mann Investors, Inc.

Horace Mann also has administrative services for school districts, such as Section 125 cafeteria plans that allow school employees to pay for unreimbursed medical expenses and dependent care expenses with pre-tax dollars; Third-Party Administrator (TPA) providing administrative and consulting services for 403(b) and 457(b) plans to ensure compliance with IRS regulations and financial literacy workshops. The company sponsors several awards recognizing excellence in education, including the NEA Foundation Awards for Teaching Excellence. Horace Mann has also partnered with DonorsChoose.org.

== Horace Mann Educators Foundation ==
The Horace Mann Educators Foundation is a 501(c)(3) nonprofit organization established in 2020 by the Horace Mann Educators Corporation. The foundation provides grants and resources intended to support American public school educators and students.

== See also ==
- List of United States insurance companies
- Horace Mann Educators Headquarters building
