= AD&D =

AD&D may refer to:

- Accidental death and dismemberment insurance
- Advanced Dungeons & Dragons, a role-playing game
