= Variable universal life insurance =

Life insurance combining flexible premiums with investment-linked cash-value accounts

Variable universal life insurance (often shortened to VUL) is a type of life insurance that builds a cash value. In a VUL, the cash value can be invested in a wide variety of separate accounts, similar to mutual funds, and the choice of which of the available separate accounts to use is entirely up to the contract owner. The 'variable' component in the name refers to this ability to invest in separate accounts whose values vary—they vary because they are invested in stock and/or bond markets. The 'universal' component in the name refers to the flexibility the owner has in making premium payments. The premiums can vary from nothing in a given month up to maximums defined by the Internal Revenue Code for life insurance. This flexibility is in contrast to whole life insurance that has fixed premium payments that typically cannot be missed without lapsing the policy (although one may exercise an Automatic Premium Loan feature, or surrender dividends to pay a Whole Life premium).

Variable universal life is a type of permanent life insurance, because the death benefit will be paid if the insured dies at any time as long as there is sufficient cash value to pay the costs of insurance in the policy. With most if not all VULs, unlike whole life, there is no endowment age (the age at which the cash value equals the death benefit amount, which for whole life is typically 100). This is yet another key advantage of VUL over Whole Life. With a typical whole life policy, the death benefit is limited to the face amount specified in the policy, and at endowment age, the face amount is all that is paid out. Thus with either death or endowment, the insurance company keeps any cash value built up over the years. However, some participating whole life policies offer riders which specify that any dividends paid on the policy be used to purchase "paid up additions" to the policy which increase both the cash value and the death benefit over time.

If investments made in the separate accounts out-perform the general account of the insurance company, a higher rate of return can occur than the fixed rates of return typical for the whole life. The combination over the years of no endowment age, continually increasing death benefit, and if a high rate of return is earned in the separate accounts of a VUL policy; this could result in higher value to the owner or beneficiary than that of a whole life policy with the same amounts of money paid in as premiums.

== Regulation of VUL providers ==
Because the separate accounts are securities, the representative providing a VUL must be working in accordance with the securities regulations of the country or province in which he operates. And because they are life insurance policies, VULs may only be sold by representatives who are properly licensed to sell life insurance in the areas in which they operate. The insurance company providing the policy must also be licensed as an "insurer."

This dual regulation helps protect consumers, who can look up the track record of offenses of any provider listed by the regulating SRO (self-regulatory organization) or provincial securities commission.

1. United States. VULs may only be sold in the United States by representatives who have a "producers" life insurance license in the state(s) in which they operate. The insurance company providing the policy must also be licensed in the state(s) as an "insurer." Because the separate accounts are securities, the representative must be working through a broker/dealer registered with the United States' SRO, the Financial Industry Regulatory Authority (FINRA) and himself be registered with FINRA. (FINRA has an online database an investor can use to look up offenses and regulatory actions of any broker or broker/dealer.) The fact of a representative's securities registration will show on his state insurance license as "Variable" as in "qualified for Life and Variable Products." (The exact wording could vary from state to state.)
2. Canada. VULs, as life insurance policies, may only be sold in Canada by life insurance-licensed representatives registered with the insurance regulator in their provincial jurisdiction. Representatives must comply with the life insurance regulations of their respective province (typically, a provincial "Insurance Act"). And, as VULs are life insurance policies, providers must comply with the national life insurance regulations ("Insurance Companies Act") established by The Office of the Superintendent of Financial Institutions (OSFI). Since VULs are presently not considered to be securities in Canada, they are subject to lighter regulatory scrutiny than typical securities products. In Canada, there is no real differentiation between universal life and variable universal life.

== Uses ==
Variable universal life insurance receives special tax advantages in the United States Internal Revenue Code. The cash value in life insurance is able to earn investment returns without incurring current income tax as long as it meets the definition of life insurance and the policy remains in force. The tax-free investment returns could be considered to be used to pay for the costs of insurance inside the policy. See the 'Tax Benefits' section for more.

In one theory of life insurance, needs based analysis, life insurance is only needed to the extent that assets left behind by a person will not be enough to meet the income and capital needs of his or her dependents. In one form of variable universal life insurance, the cost of insurance purchased is based only on the difference between the death benefit and the cash value (defined as the net amount at risk from the perspective of the insurer). Therefore, the greater the cash value accumulation, the lesser the net amount at risk, and the less insurance that is purchased.

Another use of Variable Universal Life Insurance is among relatively wealthy persons who give money yearly to their children to put into VUL policies under the gift tax exemption. Very often persons in the United States with a net worth high enough that they will encounter the estate tax give money away to their children to protect that money being taxed. Often this is done within a VUL policy because this allows a tax deferral (for which no alternative would exist besides tuition money saved in an educational IRA or 529 plan), provides for permanent life insurance, and can usually be accessed tax-free by borrowing against the policy.

== Contract features ==
By allowing the contract owner to choose the investments inside the policy the insured takes on the investment risk, and receives the greater potential return of the investments in return. If the investment returns are very poor this could lead to a policy lapsing (ceasing to exist as a valid policy). To avoid this, many insurers offer guaranteed death benefits up to a certain age as long as a given minimum premium is paid.

== Premium flexibility ==
VUL policies have a great deal of flexibility in choosing how much premiums to pay for a given death benefit. The minimum premium is primarily affected by the contract features offered by the insurer. To maintain a death benefit guarantee, that specified premium level must be paid every month. To keep the policy in force, typically no premium needs to be paid as long as there is enough cash value in the policy to pay that month's cost of insurance. The maximum premium amounts are heavily influenced by the code for life insurance. Internal Revenue Code section 7702 sets limits for how much cash value can be allowed and how much premium can be paid (both in a given year, and over certain periods of time) for a given death benefit. The most efficient policy in terms of cash value growth would have the maximum premium paid for the minimum death benefit. Then the costs of insurance would have the minimum negative effect on the growth of the cash value. In the extreme would be a life insurance policy that had no life insurance component, and was entirely cash value. If it received favorable tax treatment as a life insurance policy it would be the perfect tax shelter, pure investment returns, and no insurance cost. In fact, when variable universal life policies first became available in 1986, contract owners were able to make very high investments into their policies and received extraordinary tax benefits. In order to curb this practice, but still encourage life insurance purchase, the IRS developed guidelines regarding allowed premiums for a given death benefit.

=== Maximum premiums ===
The standard set was twofold: to define a maximum amount of cash value per death benefit and to define a maximum premium for a given death benefit. If the maximum premium is exceeded the policy no longer qualifies for all of the benefits of a life insurance contract and is instead known as a modified endowment contract or a MEC. A MEC still receives tax free investment returns, and a tax free death benefit, but withdrawals of cash value in a MEC are on a 'LIFO' basis, where earnings are withdrawn first and taxed as ordinary income. If the cash value in a contract exceeds the specified percentage of death benefit, the policy no longer qualifies as life insurance at all and all investment earnings become immediately taxable in the year the specified percentage is exceeded. In order to avoid this, contracts define the death benefit to be the higher of the original death benefit or the amount needed to meet IRS guidelines. The maximum cash value is determined to be a certain percentage of the death benefit. The percentage ranges from 30% or so for young insured persons, declining to 0% for those reaching age 100.

The maximum premiums are set by the IRS guidelines such that the premiums paid within a seven-year period after a qualifying event (such as purchase or death benefit increase), grown at a 6% rate, and using the maximum guaranteed costs of insurance in the policy contract, would endow the policy at age 100 (i.e. the cash value would equal the death benefit). More specific rules are adjusted for premiums that are not paid in equal amounts over a seven-year period. The entire maximum premium (greater than the 7 year premium) can be paid in one year and no more premiums can be paid unless the death benefit is increased. If the 7 year level guideline premium is exceeded, then the policy becomes a MEC.

To add more confusion the seven-year MEC premium level cannot be paid in a VUL every year for 7 years, and still avoid MEC status. The MEC premium level can only be paid in practice for about 4 years before additional premiums cannot be paid if non MEC status is desired. There is another premium designed to be the maximum premium that can be paid every year a policy is in force. This premium carries different names from different insurers, one calling it the guideline maximum premium. This is the premium that often reaches the most efficient use of the policy.

== Investment choices ==
The number and type of choices available vary from company to company, and from policy to policy. The current generation of VUL policies have a wide variety of sub-accounts for the policy owner to allocate their cash surrender values into. These newer policies often offer 50 or more separate accounts covering the entire spectrum of asset classes and management styles.

Separate accounts are organized as trusts to be managed for the benefit of the insureds, and are so named because they are kept 'separate' from the 'general account' of the life insurance company. They are similar to mutual funds, but have different regulatory requirements.

== Tax advantages ==
- Tax-deferred growth of cash surrender values while a policy is in force
- FIFO withdrawal status on premiums paid into the contract
- Income tax-free policy loans from policies that are not Modified Endowment Contracts
- Income tax-free death benefits (may be subject to estate tax if policy is owned by the insured)

Taxes are the main reason those in higher tax brackets (25%+) would desire to use a VUL over any other accumulation strategy. For someone in a 34% tax bracket (Federal & State), the investment return on the separate accounts may average 10%, and at say age 75 the policy's death benefit would have an internal rate of return of 9%. In order to get a 9% rate of return in an ordinary taxable account, in a 34% tax bracket, one must earn 13.64%. An alternative for this in the 34% tax bracket would be to consider using Variable Annuities which does not limit the contributions and withdraw from it without annuitizing the contract.

Other alternatives for those in the 34% tax bracket that own their own companies would be to consider SEP IRAs, company 401ks, or retirement arrangements from a company perspective, or to incorporate and consult a tax specialist.

These numbers assume expenses that may vary from company to company, and it is assumed that the VUL is funded with a minimum face value for the level of premium. The cash values would also be available to fund lifestyle or personally managed investments on a tax-free basis in the form of refunds of premiums paid in and policy loans (which would be paid off on death by the death benefit.)

== Risks of variable universal life ==
- Cost of insurance - the cost of insurance for VULs is generally based on term rates and as the insured ages, the risk of mortality increases, increasing the cost of insurance. If not monitored properly the cost of insurance may eventually exceed the cash outlay depleting savings. If this continues long-term the savings will be depleted and the insured will be given an option to increase the cash outlay to cover the higher cost of insurance or cancel the policy leaving them with no savings and either no insurance, or very expensive insurance.
- Cash outlay - the cash needed to effectively use a VUL is generally much higher than other types of insurance policies. If a policy does not have the right amount of funding, it may lapse.
- Investment risk - because the subaccounts in the VUL may be invested in stocks and bonds, the insured now take on the investment risk rather than the insurance company. The loss and gain of the investment fund mainly depend on the stock market flow.
- Complexity - the VUL is a complex product, and can easily be used (or sold) inappropriately because of this. Proper funding, investing, and planning are usually required in order for the VUL to work as expected.

== General uses of variable universal life ==
These are the features typically marketed by insurance companies, however, the VUL in most cases will limit the insured to being able to take advantage of only one of these features listed. Each of these features can be achieved through other means.

- Financial protection - as with all life insurance programs, VULs can be used to protect a family in the case of premature death.
- Tax advantages - because of its tax-deferred feature, the VUL may offer an attractive tax advantage, especially to those in higher tax brackets. To attain them, the policy must be highly funded (though still non-MEC), for the tax advantages to offset the cost of insurance. These tax advantages can be used for either...
  - Education planning - the cash value of a VUL can be used to help fund children's education, as long as the policy is started very early. Also, putting money into a VUL can be used to help children qualify for federal financial aid, since the federal government does not consider the cash value when calculating EFC (Expected Family Contribution).
  - Retirement planning - because of its tax-free policy loan feature, the VUL can also be used as a tax-advantaged income source in retirement, assuming retirement is not in the near future and the policy is not a modified endowment contract. Again, the policy must be properly funded for this strategy to work.
- Estate planning - those with a large estate (A filing is required for estates with combined gross assets and prior taxable gifts exceeding $5,430,000 effective for decedents dying on or after January 1, 2015) can sometimes use a VUL as part of their estate planning strategy to reduce or avoid estate taxes by setting up a life insurance trust sometimes known as an ILIT.

== Criticisms of variable universal life ==
Some general criticisms

- Potentially higher costs - VUL policies may be more expensive than other types of permanent insurance, such as Whole Life and traditional Universal Life. Volatility of cash surrender values, especially at late duration, can cause a "reverse dollar cost averaging" effect that results in higher costs of insurance charges. Proper funding of a contract may reduce this risk, but it cannot be completely eliminated.
- Some older VUL policies have limited sub-account choices. This issue has been greatly corrected with the current generation of policies having 50 or more sub-accounts that cover all the major asset classes, with more than one sub-account manager.
- Policy administrative expenses and costs of insurance may increase at the company's whim, subject to a contractual maximum.
- VUL is relatively complex compared to traditional Whole Life or Term Life.

Some criticism is not about the product, but rather the sales tactics used by some insurance agents.

- Projecting the maximum illustrated assumed interest rates (generally, 12%), using current (or assumed) administrative expenses and current costs of insurance, without showing the prospective client several other assumed rates of return, creating a Blue Sky problem.

Some regulators are criticized, as well.

- The Financial Industry Regulatory Authority (FINRA) does not allow insurance companies to illustrate VUL policies using a stochastic projection (commonly called a 'Monte Carlo Simulation'), limiting agents to use 'straight line', constant interest assumptions.
