= Universal life insurance =

Cash value life insurance in the US

Universal life insurance (often shortened to UL) is a type of cash value life insurance, sold primarily in the United States. Under the terms of the policy, the excess of premium payments above the current cost of insurance is credited to the cash value of the policy, which is credited each month with interest. The policy is debited each month by a cost of insurance (COI) charge as well as any other policy charges and fees drawn from the cash value, even if no premium payment is made that month. Interest credited to the account is determined by the insurer but has a contractual minimum rate (often 2%). When an earnings rate is pegged to a financial index such as a stock, bond or other interest rate index, the policy is an "Indexed universal life" contract.

== Similar life insurance types ==
A similar type of policy that was developed from universal life insurance is the variable universal life insurance policy (VUL). VUL lets the cash value be directed to a number of separate accounts that operate like mutual funds and can be invested in stock or bond investments with greater risk and potential growth. Additionally, there is the recent addition of indexed universal life contracts similar to equity-indexed annuities which credit interest linked to the positive movement of an index, such as the S&P 500, Russell 2000, and the Dow Jones. Unlike VUL, the cash value of an Index UL policy generally has principal protection, less the costs of insurance and policy administrative fees. Index UL participation in the index may have a cap, margin, or other participation modifier, as well as a minimum guaranteed interest rate.

Universal life is similar in some ways to, and was developed from, whole life insurance, although the actual cost of insurance inside the UL policy is based on annually renewable term life insurance. The advantage of the universal life policy is its premium flexibility and adjustable death benefits. The death benefit can be increased (subject to insurability), or decreased at the policy owner's request.

The premiums are flexible, from a minimum amount specified in the policy, to the maximum amount allowed by the contract. The primary difference is that the universal life policy shifts some of the risk for maintaining the death benefit to the policy owner. In a whole life policy, as long as every premium payment is made, the death benefit is guaranteed to the maturity date in the policy, usually age 95, or to age 121. A UL policy lapses when the cash value is no longer sufficient to cover the insurance and policy administrative expense.

To make UL policies more attractive, insurers have added secondary guarantees, where if certain minimum premium payments are made for a given period, the policy remains in force for the guaranteed period even if the cash value drops to zero. These are commonly called no lapse guarantee riders, and the product is commonly called guaranteed universal life (GUL, not to be confused with group universal life insurance, which is also typically shortened to GUL).

The trend up until 2007–2008 was to reduce premiums on GUL to the point where there was virtually no cash surrender values at all, essentially creating a level term policy that could last to age 121. Since then, many companies have introduced either a second GUL policy that has a slightly higher premium, but in return the policy owner has cash surrender values that show a better internal rate of return on surrender than the additional premiums could earn in a risk-free investment outside of the policy.

With the requirement for all new policies to use the latest mortality table (CSO 2001) beginning January 1, 2004, many GUL policies have been repriced, and the general trend is toward slight premium increases compared to the policies from 2008.

Another major difference between universal life and whole life insurances: the administrative expenses and cost of insurance within a universal life contract are transparent to the policy owner, whereas the assumptions the insurance company uses to determine the premium for a whole life insurance policy are not transparent.

== Uses of universal life insurance ==
- Final expenses, such as a funeral, burial, and unpaid medical bills
- Income replacement, to provide for surviving spouses and dependent children
- Debt coverage, to pay off personal and business debts, such as a home mortgage or business operating loan
- Estate liquidity, when an estate has an immediate need for cash to settle federal estate taxes, state inheritance taxes, or unpaid income taxes on income in respect of a decedent (IRD)
- Estate replacement, when an insured has donated assets to a charity and wants to replace the value with cash death benefits
- Business succession & continuity, for example to fund a cross-purchase or stock redemption buy/sell agreement
- Key person insurance, to protect a company from the economic loss incurred when a key employee or manager dies
- Executive bonus, under IRC Sec. 162, where an employer pays the premium on a life insurance policy owned by a key person. The employer deducts the premium as an ordinary business expense, and the employee pays the income tax on the premium
- Controlled executive bonus, just like above, but with an additional contract between an employee and employer that effectively limits the employee's access to cash values for a period of time (golden handcuffs)
- Split dollar plans, where the death benefits, cash surrender values, and premium payments are split between an employer and employee, or between an individual and a non-natural person (e.g. trust)
- Non-qualified deferred compensation, as an informal funding vehicle where a corporation owns the policy, pays the premiums, receives the benefits, and then uses them to pay, in whole or in part, a contractual promise to pay retirement benefits to a key person, or survivor benefits to the deceased key person's beneficiaries
- An alternative to long-term care insurance, where new policies have accelerated benefits for Long Term Care
- Mortgage acceleration, where an over-funded UL policy is either surrendered or borrowed against to pay off a home mortgage
- A life insurance retirement plan utilizes the cash value of a life insurance policy to invest in the stock market and provide income. The cash value can be withdrawn tax-free, but requires "overfunding" the policy with large premiums and service fees to be considered viable
- Term life insurance alternative, for example when a policy owner wants to use interest income from a lump sum of cash to pay a term life insurance premium. An alternative is to use the lump sum to pay premiums into a UL policy on a single premium or limited premium basis, creating tax arbitrage when the costs of insurance are paid from untaxed excess interest credits, which may be crediting at a higher rate than other guaranteed, no risk asset classes (e.g. U.S. Treasury Bonds or U.S. Savings Bonds)
- Whole life insurance alternative, where there is a need for permanent death benefits, but little or no need for cash surrender values, then a current assumption UL or GUL may be an appropriate alternative, with potentially lower net premiums
- Annuity alternative, when a policy owner has a lump sum of cash that they intend to leave to the next generation, a single premium UL policy provides similar benefits during life, but has a stepped up death benefit that is income tax-free
- Pension maximization, where permanent death benefits are needed so an employee can elect the highest retirement income option from a defined benefit pension
- Annuity maximization, where a large non-qualified annuity with a low cost basis is no longer needed for retirement and the policy owner wants to maximize the value for the next generation. There is potential for arbitrage when the annuity is exchanged for a single premium immediate annuity (SPIA), and the proceeds of the SPIA are used to fund a permanent death benefit using Universal Life. This arbitrage is magnified at older ages, and when a medical impairment can produce substantially higher payments from a medically underwritten SPIA
- RMD maximization, where an IRA owner is facing required minimum distributions (RMD), but has no need for current income, and desires to leave the IRA for heirs. The IRA is used to purchase a qualified SPIA that maximizes the current income from the IRA, and this income is used to purchase a UL policy
- Creditor/predator protection. A person who earns a high income, or who has a high net worth, and who practices a profession that suffers a high risk from predation by litigation, may benefit from using UL as a warehouse for cash, because in some states the policies enjoy protection from the claims of creditors, including judgments from lawsuits

== Living benefits of life insurance ==
Many people use life insurance, and in particular cash value life insurance, as a source of benefits to the owner of the policy (as opposed to the death benefit, which provides benefit to the beneficiary). These benefits include loans, withdrawals, collateral assignments, split dollar agreements, pension funding, and tax planning.

=== Loans ===
Most universal life policies come with an option to take a loan on certain values associated with the policy. These loans require interest payments to the insurance company. The insurer charges interest on the loan because they are no longer able to receive any investment benefit from the money they lent to the policy holder.

Participating loans are generally associated with certain Index Universal Life policies. Since these policies will never incur a loss on the investment portion due to hedging, participating loans are secured by the policy's Account Value, and allow whatever index strategy that was in place prior to creating the loan to remain in place and unaffected as to whatever index return is realized. Standard loans require conversion of any ongoing index allocations to be terminated, and an amount at least equal to the loan moved into the policy's Fixed Account.

Repayment of the loan principal is not required, but payment of the loan interest is required. If the loan interest is not paid, it is deducted from the cash value of the policy. If there is not sufficient value in the policy to cover interest, the policy lapses.

Loans are not reported to any credit agency, and payment or non-payment against them doesn't affect the policyholder's credit rating. If the policy has not become a "modified endowment", the loans are withdrawn from the policy values as premium first and then any gain. Taking Loans on UL affects the long-term viability of the plan. The cash values removed by loan are no longer earning the interest expected, so the cash values don't grow as expected. This shortens the life of the policy. Usually those loans cause a greater than expected premium payment as well as interest payments.

Outstanding loans are deducted from the death benefit at the death of the insured.

=== Withdrawals ===
If done within IRS Regulations, an Equity Indexed Universal Life policy can provide income that is tax-free. This is done through withdrawals that do not exceed the total premium payments made into the policy. Also, tax-free withdrawals can be made through internal policy loans offered by the insurance company, against any additional cash value within the policy. (This income can exceed policy premiums and still be taken 100% tax-free.) If the policy is set up, funded and distributed properly, according to IRS regulations, an Equity Indexed UL policy can provide an investor with many years of tax-free income.

Most universal life policies come with an option to withdraw cash values rather than take a loan. The withdrawals are subject to contingent deferred sales charges and may also have additional fees defined by the contract. Withdrawals permanently lower the death benefit of the contract at the time of the withdrawal.

Withdrawals are taken out premiums first and then gains, so it is possible to take a tax-free withdrawal from the values of the policy (this assumes the policy is not an MEC, i.e. "modified endowment contract"). Withdrawals are considered a material change that causes the policy to be tested for MEC. As a result of a withdrawal, the policy may become a MEC and could lose its tax advantages.

Withdrawing values affect the long-term viability of the plan. The cash values removed by withdrawal are no longer earning the interest expected, so the cash values don't grow as expected. To some extent this issue is mitigated by the corresponding lower death benefit.

=== Collateral assignments ===
Collateral assignments are often placed on life insurance to guarantee the loan upon the death of debtor. If a collateral assignment is placed on life insurance, the assignee receives any amount due to them before the beneficiary is paid. If there is more than one assignee, the assignees are paid based on date of the assignment, i.e., the earlier assignment date gets paid before the later assignment date.

== Types ==
=== Single premium ===
A Single Premium UL is paid for by a single, substantial, initial payment. Some policies contractually forbid any more than the one premium, and some policies are casually defined as single-premium for that reason. The policy remains in force so long as the COI charges have not depleted the account. These policies were very popular prior to 1988, as life insurance is generally a tax deferred plan, and so interest earned in the policy was not taxable as long as it remained in the policy. Further withdrawals from the policy were taken out principal first, rather than gain first and so tax free withdrawals of at least some portion of the value were an option. In 1988 changes were made in the tax code, and single premium policies purchased after were "modified endowment contract" (MEC) and subject to less advantageous tax treatment. Policies purchased before the change in code are not subject to the new tax law unless they have a "material change" in the policy (usually this is a change in death benefit or risk). A MEC is determined by total premiums paid in a 7-year period, and not by single payment. The IRS defines the method of testing whether a life insurance policy is a MEC. At any point in the life of a policy, a premium or a material change to the policy could cause it to lose its tax advantage and become a MEC.

In a MEC, premiums and accumulation are taxed like an annuity on withdrawing. The accumulations grow tax deferred and still transfer tax free to the beneficiary under Internal Revenue Service Code 101a under certain circumstances.

=== Fixed premium ===
Fixed Premium UL is paid for by periodic premium payments associated with a no lapse guarantee in the policy. Sometimes the guarantees are part of the base policy and sometimes the guarantee is an additional rider to the policy. Generally these payments are for a shorter time than the policy is in force. For example, payments may be made for 10 years, with the intention that thereafter the policy is paid-up. But it can also be permanent fixed payment for the life of policy.

Since the base policy is inherently based on cash value, the fixed premium policy only works if it is tied to a guarantee. If the guarantee is lost, the policy reverts to it flexible premium status. And if the guarantee is lost, the planned premium may no longer be sufficient to keep the coverage active. If the experience of the plan is not as good as predicted, the account value at the end of the premium period may not be adequate to continue the policy as originally written. In this case, the policyholder may have the choice to either:

1. Leave the policy alone, and let it potentially expire early (if COI charges deplete the account), or
2. Make additional or higher premium payments, to keep the death benefit level, or
3. Lower the death benefit.

Many universal life contracts taken out in the high interest periods of the 1970s and 1980s faced this situation and lapsed when the premiums paid were not enough to cover the cost of insurance.

=== Flexible premium ===
Flexible Premium UL allows the policyholder to vary their premiums within certain limits. Inherently UL policies are flexible premium, but each variation in payment has a long-term effect that must be considered. To remain active, the policy must have sufficient available cash value to pay for the cost of insurance. Higher than expected payments could be required if the policyholder has skipped payments or has been paying less than originally planned. It is recommended that yearly illustrative projections be requested from the insurer so that future payments and outcomes can be planned.

In addition, Flexible Premium UL may offer a number of different death benefit options, which typically include at least the following:

- a level death benefit (often called Option A or Option 1, Type 1, etc.), or
- a level amount at risk (often called Option B, etc.); this is also referred to as an increasing death benefit.

Policyholders may also buy Flexible Premium UL with a large initial deposit, thereafter making payments irregularly.

== Criticism ==
=== Misleadingly sold as an investment ===
In the US, it is illegal under the Investment Advisers Act of 1940 to offer Universal Life Insurance as an "investment" to individuals, but it is frequently offered by agents as a tax-advantaged financial vehicle from which they can borrow as needed later without tax penalties. This also makes it an alternative for wealthy individuals who are not able to contribute to a Roth IRA due to IRS income restraints.

It is illegal to market Index Universal Life (IUL) as an "investment security", as defined by the Securities Act of 1933 & the Securities Act of 1934. These Acts of Congress gave birth to the SEC, in reaction to the stock market crash of 1929 that preceded the Great Depression. Today, the SEC oversees FINRA and they both regulate the marketing and sale of securities. IUL is an insurance product and does not meet the definition of a security, so it does not fall under the authority of the SEC or FINRA.

Therefore, under the authority of the SEC and FINRA, Index Universal Life Insurance cannot be marketed or sold as a "security", "variable security", "variable investment" or direct investment in a "security" (or the stock market), because it is not. However, IUL can be marketed and sold as an investment.

=== High commissions, conflict of interest ===
Agents receive higher commissions for selling universal and other whole life policies than they do for selling less expensive term life insurance, leading to concerns about conflicts of interest.

Proponents respond that it would be inaccurate to state that term insurance is less expensive than universal life, or for that matter, other forms of permanent life insurance, without qualifying the statement with the other factor: time, or length of coverage.

While term life insurance is the least expensive over a short period, say one to twenty years, permanent life insurance is generally the least expensive over a longer period, or over one's entire lifetime. This is mainly due to the high percentage of the premiums paid out in commissions during the first 10–12 years.

=== Misunderstood risk to policyholders ===
Interest rate risk: UL is a complex policy with risk to the policyholder. Its flexible premiums include a risk that the policyholder may have to pay a greater than planned premium to maintain the policy. This can happen if the expected interest paid on the accumulated values is less than originally assumed at purchase. This happened to many policyholders who purchased their policies in the mid-1980s when interest rates were very high. As the interest rates lowered, the policy did not earn as expected and the policyholder was forced to pay more to maintain the policy. If any form of loan is taken on the policy, this may cause the policyholder to pay a greater than expected premium, because the loaned values are no longer in the policy to earn for the policyholder. If the policyholder skips payments or makes late payments, they may have to make that up in later years by making larger than expected payments. Market factors relating to the 2008 stock market crash adversely affected many policies by increasing premiums, decreasing benefit, or decreasing the term of coverage. On the other hand, many older policies (especially well-funded ones) benefit from the unusually high interest guarantees of 4% or 4.5%, which are common for policies issued prior to 2000. Policies from that era may benefit from voluntary increases in premium, which capture these artificially high rates.

No-lapse guarantees, or death benefit guarantees: A well informed policyholder should understand that the flexibility of the policy is tied irrevocably to risk to the policyholder. The more guarantees a policy has, the more expensive its cost. And with UL, many of the guarantees are tied to an expected premium stream. If the premium is not paid on time, the guarantee may be lost and cannot be reinstated. For example, some policies offer a "no lapse" guarantee, which states that if a stated premium is paid in a timely manner, the coverage remains in force, even if there is not sufficient cash value to cover the mortality expenses. It is important to distinguish between this no lapse guarantee and the actual death benefit coverage. The death benefit coverage is paid for by mortality charges (also called cost of insurance). As long as these charges can be deducted from the cash value, the death benefit is active. The "no lapse" guarantee is a safety net that provides for coverage in the event that the cash value isn't large enough to cover the charges. This guarantee is lost if the policyholder does not make the premium as agreed, although the coverage itself may still be in force. Some policies do not provide for the possibility of reinstating this guarantee. Sometimes the cost associated with the guarantee is still deducted even if the guarantee itself is lost (those fees are often built into the cost of insurance and the costs don't change when the guarantee is lost). Some policies provide an option for reinstating the guarantee within certain time frames and/or with additional premiums (usually catching up the deficit of premiums and an associated interest). No-lapse guarantees can also be lost when loans or withdrawals are taken against the cash values.

=== Use as a tax haven ===
The product is increasingly being used by wealthy individuals as a way to avoid income and estate taxes rather than serving as insurance.

== Miscellaneous ==
The single largest asset class of all but one of the largest banks in the United States is permanent cash value life insurance, commonly referred to as BOLI, or Bank Owned Life Insurance. During the recent economic crisis, banks accelerated their purchasing of BOLI as it was the single most secure investment they could make. One banker described BOLI as a "constantly resetting municipal bond that I never have to mark to market." The majority of BOLI is current assumption Universal Life, usually sold as a single premium contract.
