= Insurability =

Conditions under which a risk can be covered by insurance

Insurability can mean either whether a particular type of loss (risk) can be insured in theory, or whether a particular client is insurable for by a particular company because of particular circumstance and the quality assigned by an insurance provider pertaining to the risk that a given client would have.

An individual with very low insurability may be said to be uninsurable, and an insurance company will refuse to issue a policy to such an applicant. For example, an individual with a terminal illness and a life expectancy of 6 months would be uninsurable for term life insurance. This is because the probability is so high for the individual to die within the term of the insurance, that he/she would present far too high a liability for the insurance company. A similar, and stereotypical, example would be earthquake insurance in California.

Insurability is sometimes an issue in case law of torts and contracts. It also comes up in issues involving tontines and insurance fraud schemes. In real property law and real estate, insurability of title means the realty is marketable.

== Characteristics of insurable risks ==
Risks that can be insured by private companies typically share seven common characteristics.

1. Large number of similar exposure units. Since insurance operates through pooling resources, the majority of insurance policies are provided for individual members of large classes, allowing insurers to benefit from the law of large numbers in which predicted losses are similar to the actual losses. Exceptions include Lloyd's of London, which is famous for insuring the life or health of actors, actresses and sports figures. However, all exposures will have particular differences, which may lead to different rates.
2. Definite Loss. The loss takes place at a known time, in a known place, and from a known cause. The classic example is death of an insured person on a life insurance policy. Fire, automobile accidents, and worker injuries may all easily meet this criterion. Other types of losses may only be definite in theory. Occupational disease, for instance, may involve prolonged exposure to injurious conditions where no specific time, place or cause is identifiable. Ideally, the time, place and cause of a loss should be clear enough that a reasonable person, with sufficient information, could objectively verify all three elements.
3. Accidental Loss. The event that constitutes the trigger of a claim should be fortuitous, or at least outside the control of the beneficiary of the insurance. The loss should be 'pure', in the sense that it results from an event for which there is only the opportunity for cost. Events that contain speculative elements, such as ordinary business risks, are generally not considered insurable.
4. Large Loss. The size of the loss must be meaningful from the perspective of the insured. Insurance premiums need to cover both the expected cost of losses, plus the cost of issuing and administering the policy, adjusting losses, and supplying the capital needed to reasonably assure that the insurer will be able to pay claims. For small losses these latter costs may be several times the size of the expected cost of losses. There is little point in paying such costs unless the protection offered has real value to a buyer.
5. Affordable Premium. If the likelihood of an insured event is so high, or the cost of the event so large, that the resulting premium is large relative to the amount of protection offered, it is not likely that anyone will buy insurance, even if on offer. Further, as the accounting profession formally recognizes in financial accounting standards, the premium cannot be so large that there is not a reasonable chance of a significant loss to the insurer. If there is no such chance of loss, the transaction may have the form of insurance, but not the substance. (See the U.S. Financial Accounting Standards Board standard number 113)
6. Calculable Loss. There are two elements that must be at least estimable, if not formally calculable: the probability of loss, and the attendant cost. Probability of loss is generally an empirical exercise, while cost has more to do with the ability of a reasonable person in possession of a copy of the insurance policy and a proof of loss associated with a claim presented under that policy to make a reasonably definite and objective evaluation of the amount of the loss recoverable as a result of the claim.
7. Limited risk of catastrophically large losses. Insurable losses are ideally independent and non-catastrophic, meaning that the one losses do not happen all at once and individual losses are not severe enough to bankrupt the insurer; insurers may prefer to limit their exposure to a loss from a single event to some small portion of their capital base, on the order of 5 percent. Capital constrains insurers' ability to sell earthquake insurance as well as wind insurance in hurricane zones. In the U.S., flood risk is insured by the federal government. An instance where the question whether insurability exists is contested is the case of nanotechnology. In commercial fire insurance it is possible to find single properties whose total exposed value is well in excess of any individual insurer's capital constraint. Such properties are generally shared among several insurers, or are insured by a single insurer who syndicates the risk into the reinsurance market.

== Insurable interest ==
Insurable interest refers to the right of property to be insured. It may also mean the interest of a beneficiary of a life insurance policy to prove need for the proceeds, called the "insurable interest doctrine".

For purposes of life insurance, close relatives are assumed to have an insurable interest in the lives of those relatives, but more distant relatives, such as cousins and in-laws cannot buy insurance of the lives of others related by these connections. Thus, a married person has an insurable interest in the life of their spouse, and minor children have an insurable interest in their parents. A person is also presumed to have an insurable interest in his or her own life.

In the U.K. a person is considered to have an unlimited interest in the life of their spouse, which the law considers broadly equivalent to having an insurable interest in their own life. Even if not financially dependent on the other, it is legitimate to insure against the death of a spouse. Although many insurers will accept policies of cohabiting couples, they could potentially be invalidated. In recent years, there have been moves to pass clear statutory provisions in this regard, which have not yet borne fruit. Similar treatment was recently extended to civil partners under section 253 of the Civil Partnership Act 2004.

Insurable interest is no longer strictly an element of life insurance contracts under modern law, for example with viatication agreements and charitable donations. Often there is no requirement today that the beneficiary have a proven insurable interest in the life of the insured when the insured has purchased the insurance.

== Insurability of fines ==
The landscape for insuring regulatory fines is evolving. The UK Supreme Court case of Singularis Holdings Ltd v Daiwa Capital Markets Europe Ltd [2019] UKSC 50 leaves open the possibility of companies being covered for fines where they are not vicariously liable. This may be particularly relevant for directors & officers' liability policies with cover the company itself.

== See also ==
- Insurance law
