= Internal Revenue Code section 79 =

Section 79 of the U.S. Internal Revenue Code sets out the U.S. Federal income tax law concerning term life insurance plans provided by employers. Tax benefits are available for both employers and participating employees, under certain conditions.

== Section 79 plans ==
Section 79 details the tax consequences and requirements for employers wishing to install a group-term life insurance plan. Permanent life insurance may also be offered as an added benefit in a Section 79 plan. Section 79 plans are non-qualified as defined by the Internal Revenue Code, but still offer a tax deduction for sponsoring employers.

An employee must include in gross income for Federal income tax purposes an amount equal to the cost of group-term life insurance coverage on the employee's life to the extent that the cost of the coverage exceeds the sum of $50,000 plus the amount (if any) paid by the employee to purchase the coverage. Contributions to a Section 79 plan are tax-deductible, though for owner(s), and 2% or more shareholders, contributions are deductible only if paid by, and from, a C Corporation.

A Section 79 benefit program may allow the following benefits.

1. The ability to purchase permanent life insurance with corporate dollars
2. Deduct all of the cost to the C corporation as a business expense (Note: policy loans and withdrawals reduce the policies cash value and death benefit and may result in a taxable event)
3. Allow the transfer of corporate dollars to the business owner on a tax-favored basis (Note: although 100% deductible at the corporate level, contributions to a section 79 plan also provide an economic benefit to the owner and income tax will be required on approximately 60% of the contribution)
4. Grow the money in the plan in a tax-deferred setting
5. Access to money in the plan can be achieved through policy loans on a tax-deferred basis
6. Death benefits can pass to heirs on an income tax-free basis.
7. There are no regulatory limits on funding for the key participants
8. May provide asset protection by removing plan assets from the reach of company creditors
9. Provides for minimal rank and file employee cost
10. Insurance cash values may provide tax-free income as long as the policy is kept in force and withdrawals do not exceed the cost basis

A section 79 plan may be used for the following applications

1. Group life insurance benefits
2. Deductible insurance to fund estate planning needs of the business owner
3. Deductible insurance to provide personal life insurance needs for the owner
4. Deductible insurance to fund a buy-sell agreement or key man policy
5. Future business buyout on a tax-advantaged basis

== Determining the death benefit ==
Death benefits can be determined by a number of different methods at the discretion of the employee: from a minimum coverage of group term insurance to a permanent benefit up to a pre-determined multiple of the employee's reported W-2 income. The tax consequences and funding commitment to the employee will be impacted by the option they choose within the plan. In the case of an employee making $245,000, if a 10× multiple is used, that employee will receive a death benefit equal to $2,450,000 ($245,000 × 10). The resulting contribution depends heavily on what product is being used for funding, as well as the employee's age and health.

== Calculating the tax liability ==
In a non-discriminatory Section 79 plan, the first $50,000 of coverage is provided free to all employees. Any group coverage over this amount is deemed a benefit for which the employee must pay. The pure insurance portion is factored using the Internal Revenue Service (IRS) published Table I rates (scroll to page 5). If using permanent insurance the portion calculated as the 'permanent benefit' takes into account premium(s) paid, accumulated and cash surrender value, and other policy factors.

== Requirements ==
There are generally four main conditions which must be met when installing a Section 79 plan:

1. The plan must provide a death benefit excludable from income under Code section 101(a)
2. Must be provided to a group of employees
3. Must be provided under a policy carried directly or indirectly by the employer
4. Maximum death benefits for each employee based on a multiple of compensation

=== Non-discriminatory ===
In order for a Section 79 plan to maintain its non-discriminatory form other conditions must be met:

1. Cover at least 70% of employees
2. No more than 15% of the participants are key employees
3. Benefits based on reasonable classifications

=== Discriminatory ===
It is possible to have what is deemed a discriminatory Section 79 plan. Under a discriminatory plan the first $50,000 of death benefit coverage is not free for owners and key employees. Cost will again be based on the IRS Table I rates. Rank and file employees maintain their free benefit whether or not the plan is discriminatory.

Yet another set of requirements comes into play if the company has less than 10 employees.

=== Under 10 employees ===
1. Employees with less than six months of full-time employment may be excluded
2. Benefits must be based on a uniform percentage of compensation or coverage brackets, such that no bracket is more than 2.5 times the next lowest bracket and the lowest bracket is at least 10% of the highest bracket

=== Excluded employees ===
- Employees with less than 36 months of full-time employment may be excluded
- Employees under the age of 18 or over the age of 64
- Part-time or seasonal employees
- Employees covered under a union contract, provided the group term life insurance benefits were the subject of good faith bargaining
- Anyone not medically approved
- Anyone choosing to opt out

=== Coverage for spouses and dependents ===
The cost of employer-provided group-term life insurance on the life of an employee's spouse or dependent, paid by the employer, is not taxable to the employee if the face amount of the coverage does not exceed $2,000. This coverage is excluded as a de minimis fringe benefit. Some cases may allow more.
