= Life insurance retirement plan =

A life insurance retirement plan (often shortened to LIRP) is a financial strategy that uses a permanent life insurance policy to provide income. A LIRP is primarily used for retirement planning in the United States. In addition to a death benefit, the account is designed to be invested and withdrawn tax-free, similar to an individual retirement account. By utilizing the cash value of the policy, policyholders may invest large portions of income to grow tax-free in interest-bearing accounts, investments, and the stock market. A LIRP is usually maintained by a financial advisor for the benefit of a policyholder.

LIRPs have been praised for providing tax-free retirement income while simultaneously providing death benefits. However, LIRPs have been criticized for significantly higher premiums and costs, market risks, lower performance, and less suitability than standard life insurance and retirement accounts.

== Functions ==
Similar to a standard life insurance policy, a policyholder must be approved for a LIRP. The application process normally includes a medical exam, which determines the applicant's insurability and the cost of the policy.

The primary function of a LIRP is to generate tax-free income. According to IRC sections 7702, 72(e), and 101(a), the cash value of a policy can grow tax-deferred, policy loans and withdrawals are not taxable, and death benefits originating from a life insurance policy are tax-free.

A LIRP is designed to utilize the cash value of a permanent life insurance policy, such as universal or whole life. While life insurance generally requires fixed fees and payments, a policyholder may invest larger amounts of money, which is saved and invested by a financial advisor. In addition to a standard death benefit, the money invested into a LIRP is placed into stock market investments, for the purpose of growing the cash value of the policy itself.

In the United States, a pre-determined amount of money that is accrued within the policy may be withdrawn as a loan, tax-free, before reaching the age of 59½. The account uses the death benefit as collateral, in case the loan is not repaid upon the policyholder's death.

Once the policyholder is 59½ years old, any amount of the cash value of the policy may be taken as a loan or withdrawn tax-free.

The monthly cost of a LIRP is dependent upon age, level of coverage, and health. The national average is approximately $570 per month.

== Accessibility ==
LIRPs are generally sold by licensed financial advisors due to the use of investments. Since this strategy is designed for long-term growth, it is generally sold by retirement planners and companies that specialize in annuities, IRAs, and insurance policies.

Commission for the sale of life insurance retirement plans is generally 80%-110% of the first-year premium.

== Benefits ==
LIRPs are primarily used for the tax-free growth of any investments. In addition to premiums and fees, policyholders are encouraged to "overfund" the policy and invest significantly more than the minimum in order to build cash value. A LIRP and its tax benefits may be considered ideal when a consumer reaches a certain level of annual income, as the U.S. Internal Revenue Service will tax a higher percentage of one's income as it increases.

In addition, while IRAs are subject to laws restricting limits on contributions, a LIRP may have unlimited contributions, potentially maximizing the amount of assets one may own tax-free.

== Criticism ==
LIRPs are largely criticized for their notably high costs and fees. In addition to the monthly premium charged for a death benefit, LIRPs normally require management fees to be considered in good standing.

LIRPs are also largely dependent on the performance of the stock market, creating a risk of potential loss of savings. Due to the high costs and fees, LIRPs must make returns higher than a standard investment account to be considered profitable. Furthermore, due to the slow growth on the account within the first few years, it is recommended to maintain the account for over fifteen years in order to generate income and create a profit.

Because of the high costs, LIRPs are usually considered unsuitable for the majority of individuals, and the benefits are largely outweighed by the policy costs.
