= Death bond =

Life insurance securities

Death bonds are securities that are formed from a number of life insurance policies that have been purchased from their original owners by investors and pooled into bonds.
