= Mortgage life insurance =

Mortgage life insurance is a form of insurance specifically designed to protect a repayment mortgage. If the policyholder were to die while the mortgage life insurance was in force, the policy would pay out a capital sum that will be just sufficient to repay the outstanding mortgage.

Mortgage life insurance is supposed to protect the borrower's ability to repay the mortgage for the lifetime of the mortgage. This is in contrast to private mortgage insurance, which is meant to protect the lender against the risk of default on the part of the borrower.

== The Mechanics ==
When the insurance commences, the value of the insurance coverage must equal the capital outstanding on the repayment mortgage, and the policy's termination date must coincide with the scheduled date for the final payment on the mortgage. The insurance company then calculates the annual rate at which the insurance coverage should decrease to mirror the value of the capital outstanding on the repayment mortgage. Even if the client falls behind on repayments, the insurance will typically adhere to its original schedule and will not increase the outstanding debt.

Some mortgage life insurance policies will also pay out if the policyholder is diagnosed with a terminal illness from which the policyholder is expected to die within 12 months of diagnosis. Insurance companies sometimes add other features into their mortgage life insurance policies to reflect conditions in their country’s domestic insurance market and their domestic tax regulations.

== The Controversy ==
Based on the mechanics of the product, mortgage life insurance is a financial product which paradoxically declines in value as the client-borrower pays more premium to the insurer. In many cases, traditional life insurance (whether term or permanent) can offer a better level of protection for considerably smaller premiums.

The biggest advantage of traditional life insurance over mortgage life insurance is that the former maintains its face value throughout the lifetime of the policy, whereas the latter promises to pay out an amount equal to the client's outstanding mortgage debt at any point in time, which is inherently a decreasing sum. Hence, mortgage life insurance is extremely profitable for lenders and/or insurers and equally disadvantageous to borrowers.

In addition, lending banks often incentivise borrowers to purchase mortgage life insurance in addition to their new mortgage by means that are on the verge of tied selling practices. Tied selling of a product of self or of an affiliated party, however, is illegal in most jurisdictions. In Canada, for example, this practice is explicitly forbidden by Section 459.1 of the Bank Act (1991).

Finally, mortgage life insurance is not required by law. Client-borrowers decide whether to protect property with an insurance product. Similarly, the choice of insurer is completely unrestrained as well.

Because of these suboptimal qualities of mortgage life insurance, the product has been subject to sharp criticism by financial experts and by the media across North America for over a decade. This has arguably led to fewer banks actively advertising this product in the recent years, although many still keep it in their portfolios. However, many critics fail to consider that in many cases where term life insurance is denied for health reasons, mortgage life insurance is still available (this does not guarantee that you are covered, but rather you're allowed to pay the premium of the insurance, the financial institution holds the right to deny the claim. This is due to "post-claim underwriting," meaning they check to see if you qualify for the coverage when you make a claim. This will lead to a refund of premiums and no coverage). As such, mortgage life insurance can cover the biggest expense left by a deceased breadwinner - i.e. housing costs. Thus, it is simplistic to dismiss it out of hand as disadvantageous to borrowers.

Other controversies towards this class of products also exist due to the manner leads are created for mortgage protection insurance. Many of these leads pretend to be your bank or lending institution to get you to contact them. They also never state the actual organization that they represent because they are just mortgage protection insurance lead vendors.

== Private mortgage insurance ==
The term mortgage insurance may in some contexts refer to private mortgage insurance (PMI), also known as lenders mortgage insurance. Private mortgage insurance protects the lender instead of the borrower, although its premiums are payable by the borrower. This type of insurance is compulsory in certain jurisdictions for mortgages started with low down payments.

In the United States, subject to Homeowners Protection Act of 1998, a borrower who provides less than 20% down payment up front may be required to pay for private mortgage insurance until the outstanding mortgage is less than 80% of the value of the property.

== See also ==
- Health insurance
- State Disability Insurance
- Critical Illness Insurance
