= Indexed universal life =

Type of life insurance

Indexed universal life (often shortened to IUL) is a type of universal life insurance product that offers a death benefit coupled with a cash value account that can be used to pay policy premiums or take withdrawals and loans. Indexed life usually provides a floor of 0%, but offers higher upside interest crediting based on the performance of an outside stock index such as the S&P 500 Index. Indexed life insurance is a moderately conservative interest-sensitive life insurance product.

Indexed universal life insurance was first released by Transamerica in 1997 and has gained popularity as a competitive alternative to whole life insurance. Contrary to popular belief, IUL should not be sold as an investment alternative to traditional retirement accounts.
