= Return of premium life insurance =

Return of premium (ROP) life insurance is a type of term life insurance policy that returns a portion of the cumulative premiums paid if the insured outlives the policy's term. For example, a $1,000,000 policy bought for $10,000 a year over a 30-year period would result in $300,000 being refunded to the surviving policyholder at the end of the 30 years.

== Use as an investment ==
If a return of premium policy is viewed as an investment, rates of return are calculated based on the incremental cost above the cost of regular term insurance. A sampling of policies found returns in the range of 2.5 to 9 percent.

Critics point to the rate of return being less than in a typical investment, obviously before the insured's death, the extra cost of the policy compared to basic term life insurance policies and that, if the policy is canceled at any time, no money is refunded.

Many term life policies do allow prorated refunds at some point during the life of the policy, during the insured's lifetime, although such refund is usually "short rated", that is, it is significantly less than the imputed value of the refund if calculated using conventional tables, using the rate of return specified in the insurance contract. In some instances, where a contracted rate of return was 5.0 percent, the "short rate" proved to be 3.5 percent, but this fact was seldom, if ever, disclosed to the insured during the agent's "sales pitch".

== Tax implications ==
In the United States, just as with a policy's death benefit and the "interest build-up" portion of the annual increase in the policy's cash value, the return of premium you receive from a term life insurance policy is not subject to federal or state taxation.

== Use in divorce ==
A return of premium policy might be used after a divorce in which the divorce decree either requires each spouse to purchase life insurance on the other spouse or for the spouse that is paying alimony or child support to buy life insurance on themselves for a period of time to compensate the surviving party for the loss of alimony or child support.

When a party who is covered by any life insurance policy lives past the term of the insurance, the premiums paid for the traditional term policy are considered spent money for the "risk" that never occurred. By using a return of premium term life insurance policy, the insurance company would return all premiums to the party who paid for the policy. This is considered a reimbursed expense and is not taxable in the United States.
