= Pension term assurance =

U.K. life insurance

Pension Term Assurance (PTA) was a form of life insurance available within the United Kingdom where the premiums received tax relief when taken out as part of a pension. It effectively made life insurance cheaper for the consumer. Despite what the name might suggest, Pension Term Assurance did not have to form part of a pension - it merely needed to be taken out at the same time as a new pension was set up. The UK Government stopped these in 2006 and they are no longer available.

== History ==
Although PTA had been available for several years, it only became mainstream when changes were made to pension legislation on "A Day", 6 April 2006. Following these changes, PTA became a popular way of buying life insurance,

However, on 6 December 2006 the UK Government announced an important review of Pension Term Assurance (PTA). The Treasury indicated it was not happy with the PTA products on offer, and effectively stopped any more new PTA business being written. Those with existing policies were allowed to keep them running.
