= Horace Mann Educators Headquarters =

US historic building

General information
- Architectural style: International Style
- Location: 1 Horace Mann Plaza Springfield, Illinois
- Groundbreaking: December 10, 1969
- Inaugurated: June 16, 1972
- Renovated: July 2011
- Cost: $7 million
- Renovation cost: $2.8 million

Technical details
- Floor count: 6
- Floor area: 230,000 sq. ft.

Design and construction
- Architect: Minoru Yamaski
- Main contractor: Evans Construction Co.

Other information
- Public transit access: SMTD

Website
- https://www.horacemann.com/

The Horace Mann Educators Headquarters Building, is an office building located in downtown Springfield, Illinois. It is designed by Minoru Yamasaki as the headquarters of Horace Mann Educators Corporation and opened in 1972. The International Style structure was part of a massive urban renewal project on the north edge of downtown. The building, in its park-like setting, encompasses two city blocks.

== History ==
Plans for a new corporate headquarters started in the mid 1960s, as the insurance company had outgrown its current headquarters near the Illinois State Capitol. In addition, it wanted to consolidate several other buildings around the city of Springfield.

The city had acquired several blocks of real estate in downtown, and started to look for developers interested in it. While five sets of bid documents were taken out by prospective bidders, the bid from Horace Mann was the only local one received. Initially, Horace Mann's bid was for a large, 3-1/2 block project that included a 15 story high office building, as well as additional 4 story office building, apartment buildings, a 12 story hotel, a theater, and retail space. The bid was for $743,682 and would need approval of the U.S. Department of Housing and Urban Development. At the same time, members of the Springfield Metropolitan Exposition and Auditorium Authority (SMEAA) agreed to determine the availability of the south half of the site as a possible auditorium.

At the same time, the Illinois General Assembly appropriated funds to buy the block where Horace Mann's building now stands, as they wanted to have the land available for future construction of a state office building.

== Construction ==
In July 1968, Horace Mann's then-president Dan Bannister announced that the architectural contract had been awarded to Minoru Yamasaki and Associates, of Troy, Michigan. This came just three weeks after the signing of the contract for Horace Mann to purchase the land. In January 1969, Horace Mann revealed to the City Council its plans for a six story, $7 million home office building to be built on the property. This varied differently than what was proposed originally.

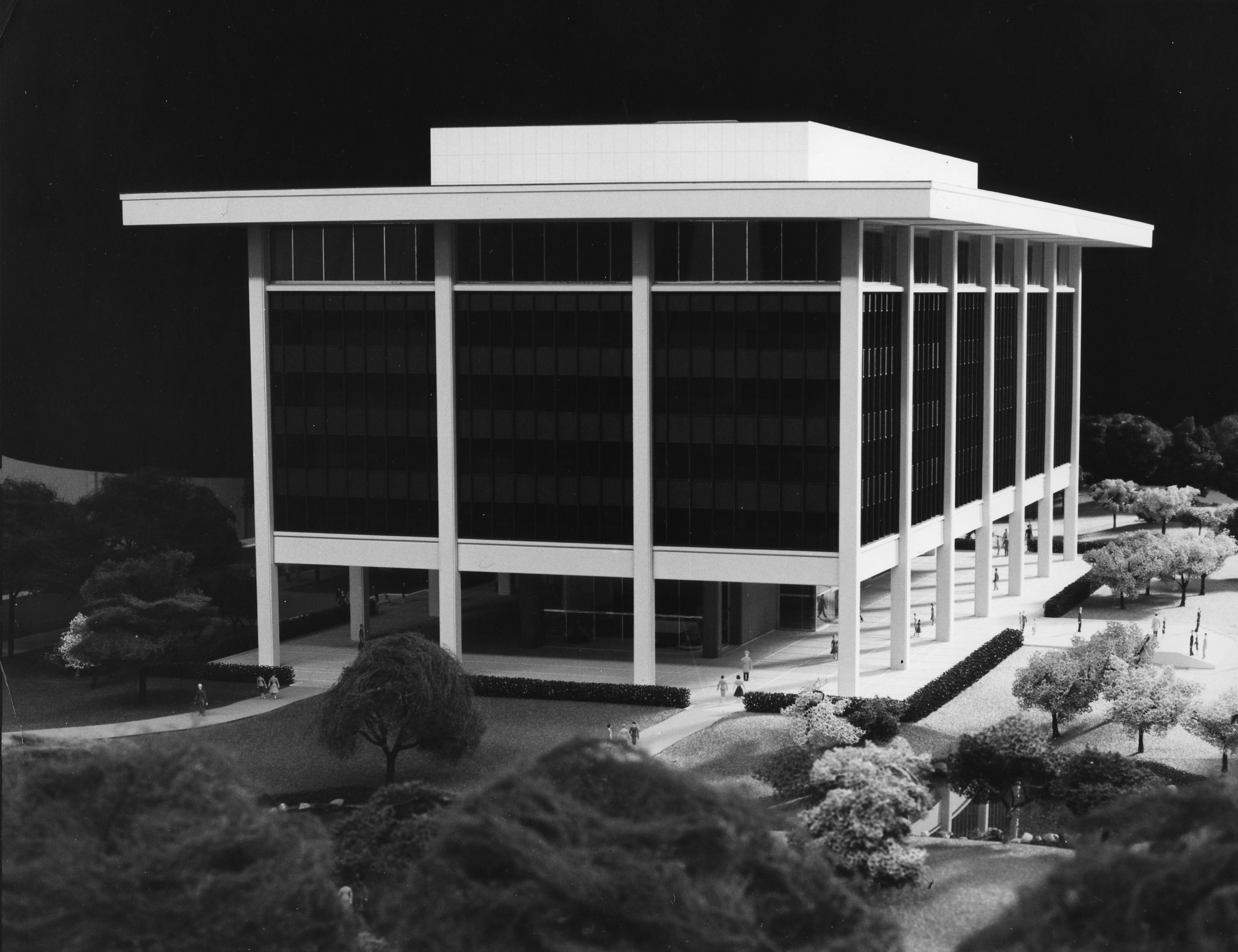
Architect's model of building

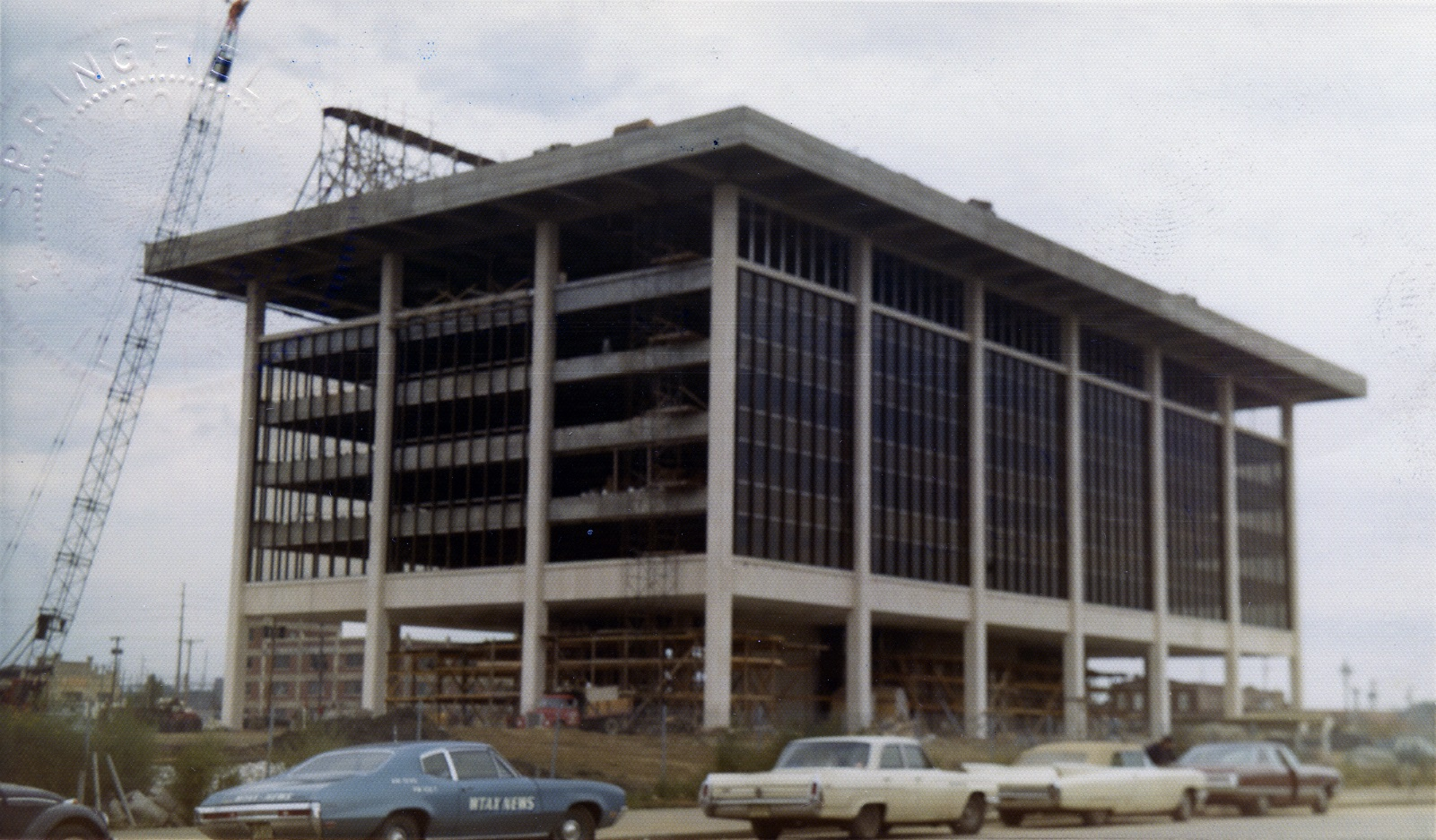
Building during construction

On March 17, 1969, the deed to the downtown commercial urban renewal land was signed by the mayor and a check for the purchase of the land was presented to the city by Horace Mann. An application for a building permit was filed in September 1969. At almost the same time, requests for proposals were sent to a number of pre-selected general contractors, including three based in Springfield.

In early December 1969, it was announced that Evans Construction Company of Springfield was the low bidder and was awarded the general contract. Groundbreaking of the building took place before the end of the year. While the construction was only to be the company's new six story headquarters, in the original project plan was the possibility for and additional building on the property. Almost two years into the construction, Dan Bannister, president of Horace Mann, petitioned the City Council for a year's extension on developing a commercial building on its urban renewal site. Bannister further suggested that perhaps the Springfield Public Library (Lincoln Library) could build on the site, which has been designated to hold a 50,000 square foot structure.

== Renovations ==
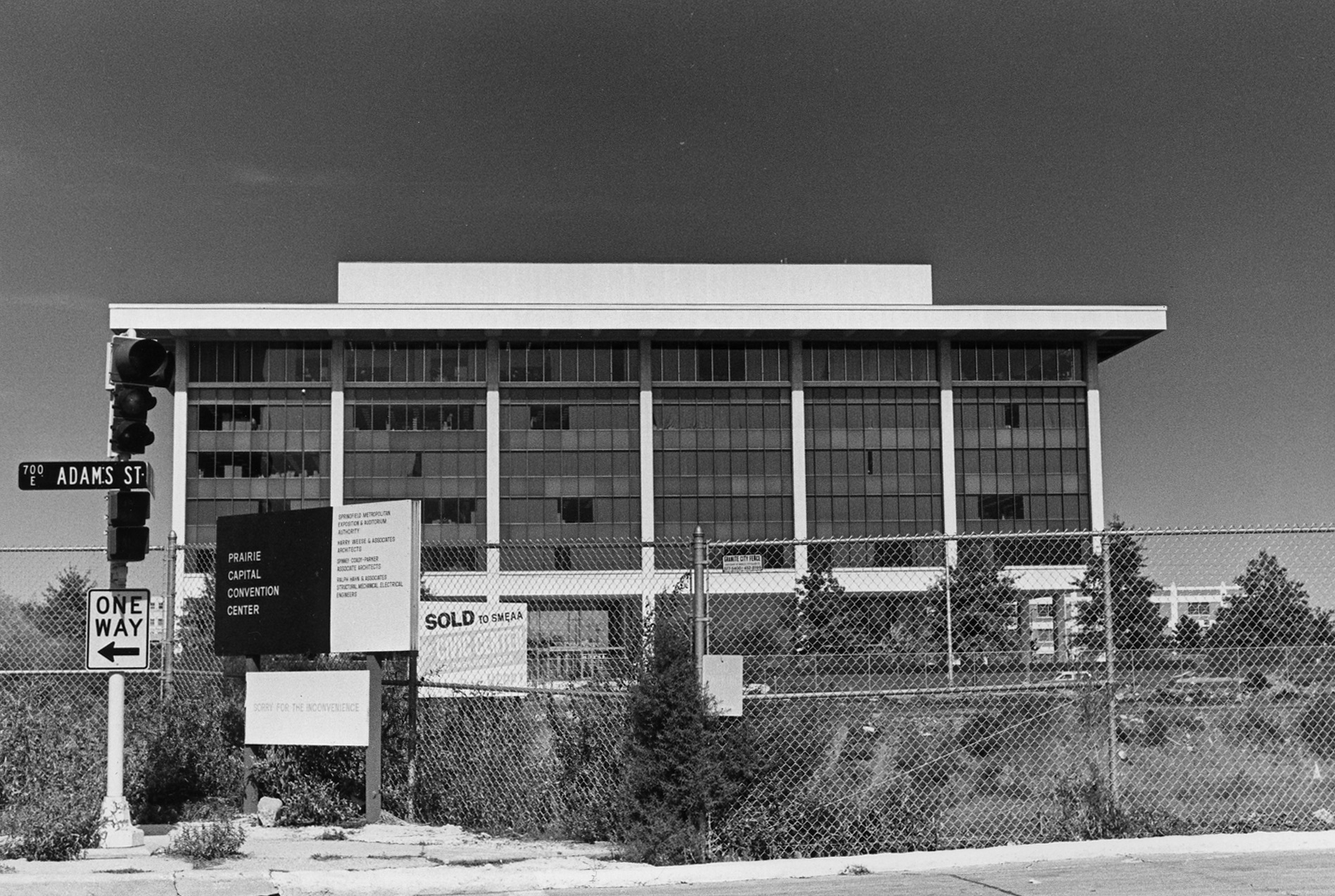
Horace Mann building in the background, with signs showing the location of the future convention center.

After nearly 40 years after its opening, a major restoration-and-repair program started in the summer of 2011. It is the first major update since the building opened. The majority of the work was repairing entrance plazas, pond renovation and restoration of the marble exterior. Making the building more energy-efficient, including the heating and air conditioning system was included.

== Former building ==
After Horace Mann moved to its new location in 1972, Horace Mann was ready to sell its former headquarters, which comprises a substantial share of the block at the front door of the State Capitol. The state had allocated funds from the Legislative Space Needs Commission in 1967 after the group learned of Horace Mann's desire to build a new headquarters in Springfield. However, then-governor Richard Ogilvie vetoed the reappropriation saying "this item of land acquisition and its related construction plans are more appropriately carried out by the Department of General Services." Instead, the buildings were sold to a group of investors, who ultimately rented the building to the State for office use. Thirteen years later, in 1987, the State purchased the properties, in order to build a new facility for the Illinois State Library.
