= Accidental death and dismemberment insurance =

Type of insurance for accidental injuries

In insurance, an accidental death and dismemberment (AD&D) policy provides financial benefits to the insured or their beneficiaries in the event of accidental death, serious injury, or dismemberment resulting from an accident.

Unlike traditional life insurance, which only pays out in the event of death, AD&D insurance provides additional coverage in case the insured experiences a serious injury or loses a limb or other body part due to an accident.

The benefits paid out by an AD&D policy can help cover medical expenses, rehabilitation costs, and other expenses associated with an accidental injury. They can also provide financial assistance to the insured's family in the event of accidental death.

== Accidental death ==
In the event of an accidental death, this insurance will pay benefits in addition to any life insurance but only up to a set amount total regardless of any other insurance held by same insurer, held by the client. This is called double indemnity coverage and is often available even when accidental death insurance is merely an add-on to a regular life insurance plan. Some of the covered accidents include traffic accidents, exposure, homicide, falls, heavy equipment accidents and drowning. Accidental deaths are the fifth leading cause of death in the U.S. as well as in Canada.

Accidental death insurance is not an investment vehicle and thus clients are paying only for sustained protection. Most policies have to be renewed periodically (with revised terms), although the client's consent with renewal is often implicitly assumed.

=== Common exclusions ===
Every insurer maintains a list of events and circumstances that void the insured's entitlement to his or her accidental death benefit. Death by illness, suicide, non-commercial aviation, war injury, and natural causes are generally not covered by AD&D. Similarly, death while under the influence of any non-prescribed drugs or alcohol is most likely exempt from coverage. Overdose with toxic or poisonous substances and injury of an athlete during a professional sporting event may void the right to claim too.

Some insurance carriers will tailor their clients' coverage to include some of the above risks, but every such extension will be accompanied by increased premiums.

Due to these restrictions, the process of claiming the benefit may be relatively lengthy; the deceased client may have to undergo autopsy and the accident may have to be officially investigated before a claim is approved by the insurer.

== Dismemberment ==
Fractional amounts of the policy will be paid out if the covered employee loses a bodily appendage or sight because of an accident. Additionally, AD&D generally pays benefits for the loss of limbs, fingers, toes, sight and permanent paralysis. The types of injuries covered and the amount paid vary by insurer and package, and are explicitly enumerated in the insurance policy.

== Coverage types ==
There are four common types of group AD&D plans offered in the United States:

1. Group Life Supplement – the AD&D benefit is included as part of a group life insurance contract, and the benefit amount is usually the same as that of the group life benefit.
2. Voluntary – the AD&D benefit is offered to members of a group. An example is an AD&D policy provided in an initial nominal amount with premiums paid by another party (such as a small $1,000 AD&D policy offered to credit union members, with the premium paid for by the credit union itself), with higher elective benefits offered to members where the member must pay the additional premiums separately.
3. Travel Accident (Business Trip) – the AD&D benefit is provided through an employee benefit plan and provides supplemental accident protection to workers while they are traveling on company business (the entire premium is usually paid by the employer).
4. Dependents – Some group AD&D plans also provide coverage for dependents.

== See also ==
- Bureau of Labor Statistics
- Life insurance
- Term life insurance
- Permanent life insurance
- Health insurance
- Health care
