= Mutual Benefits Corporation =

United States-based Ponzi scheme

Mutual Benefits Corporation was a Ft. Lauderdale, Florida based investment sales company that operated a huge ponzi scheme selling viatical settlements, with investors losing an estimated $835 million. The principal ringleader of the scam was Joel Steinger.

== Joel Steinger ==
Joel Steinger (a.k.a. Joel Steiner) was born in Brooklyn, New York in 1949. In the 1970s, he moved with his family to Florida. Later in life, he became acquainted with mobster Meyer Lansky after Steinger's brother redecorated Lansky's house. Eventually, Steinger married the daughter of a Miami banker who was an alleged associate of Lansky. After working at his father-in-law's import/export business, Steinger set up a boiler room operation selling fraudulent commodity options. The scheme resulted in a conviction for fraud and a lifetime ban from the securities industry. In 1994, Steinger set up the Mutual Benefits Corporation.

== Criminal enterprise ==
Mutual Benefits Corporation was started by Steinger, who listed himself as a mere consultant to the company because he had a criminal background and had been barred by the Securities and Exchange Commission from trading securities. It purchased life insurance policies at a discount from people with AIDS, cancer, terminal illnesses or who were elderly. Then investors were sold participation shares of the policies' death benefits and promised high returns. It operated from October 1994 to May 2004, selling $1.25 billion worth of life insurance policies to 30,000 investors. Company officials lied about the life expectancy of the policyholders to the investors, bribing a doctor to sign off on their statements. It operated as a ponzi scheme, using new investors money to pay older life insurance policies' premiums and a return to earlier investors. The SEC shut down the company in 2004.

== Prosecution and conviction ==
There were 13 people involved with the company who were either convicted or pled guilty. Joel Steinger received a 20-year prison sentence in 2014 after pleading guilty to conspiracy to commit mail and wire fraud. Co-founder and vice president Steve Steiner (the brother of Joel Steinger) pled guilty in one case and was convicted in another case and sentenced to 15 years in prison. Attorney Anthony Livoti Jr., the trustee for the investment accounts, was convicted in December 2013 and sentenced to 10 years in prison for conspiracy to commit fraud and money laundering, and Attorney Michael McNerney pleaded guilty and received five years in prison. Peter Lombardi, the company's president, was sentenced to 20 years in prison. Dr. Clark Mitchell was sentenced to 10 years in prison.

== Media ==
The ponzi scheme was featured on the CNBC television program American Greed in October 2015 entitled "Friends Without Benefits."
