= General account =

In the insurance industry, a general account is the combined or aggregate investments and other assets of an insurance company available to pay claims and benefits to which insured entities or policyholders are entitled.

The general account may also be considered everything that is not represented by a separate accounts of the firm, if such separate account has been established by the company. Should a firm have no separate accounts, then its only account is the general account. The term should not be thought of narrowly in terms of a bank account or general ledger account, but rather the broader concept of all the investments or assets of the insurance company available to meet a claim. Unlike a separate account, the general account is not attributable to any single policyholder or liability.

Policyholders of insurance policies (that are not associated with separate accounts) do not have a legal or other direct interest or right to the assets or investments of the insurance company's general account, but rather these obligations for benefits or claims are general obligations of the company. In this case, policyholders are subject to credit risk of the insurance company, that is, should the insurance company fail or go bankrupt, the claims or cash values of policies are not directly backed or collateralized by the company's investments and other assets. In the U.S., state insurance departments examine (audit) insurance companies to evaluate many things, principally to see if the company is sound and policyholder interests are protected. A.M. Best is an example of an insurance rating agency who evaluates and rates many companies on various factors such as financial strength, claims-paying and other policyholder servicing experiences.
