= Modified endowment contract =

American life insurance contract

A modified endowment contract (MEC) is a cash value life insurance contract in the United States where the premiums paid have exceeded the amount allowed to keep the full tax treatment of a cash value life insurance policy. In a modified endowment contract, distributions of cash value are taken from taxable gains first as compared to distributions taken from non taxable contributions. In other words, withdrawals will typically be taxed as ordinary income (typically the highest rates for investments) instead of treated as non taxable income.

== History ==
Modified endowments were created in the Technical and Miscellaneous Revenue Act of 1988 (TAMRA) (H.R 4333, S. 2238) in response to single-premium life (endowments) being used as tax shelters. TAMRA established the 7-Pay Test, which is a stipulated premium that would create a guaranteed paid up policy within 7 years from policy inception. If premiums paid to the contract go beyond (i.e. are higher than) the premium amount stipulated then the contract has failed the 7-Pay Test and is reclassified as a Modified Endowment Contract.

== Tax rules ==
Under U.S. tax law, all life insurance contracts share several tax advantages. Death benefits paid to beneficiaries are generally not taxable, and the growth of contractual cash value over time (sometimes called the inside buildup) is not taxed while the value stays inside the contract. The tax definition of life insurance is set forth in IRC Section 7702. A life insurance contracts that is also a MEC does not gain a third tax advantage relating to the treatment of predeath distributions, that is, money paid from the life insurance contract to the owner while living, and this is set forth in IRC Section 7702A. Namely,

- When money is withdrawn from a MEC, the withdrawal is treated as coming from gain first, which is taxable, and basis second. This order is reversed if a contract is not a MEC.
- When a policy loan is taken from a MEC, that loan counts as a withdrawal, which may trigger a taxable event. A contract that is not a MEC may freely take and repay loans without triggering a taxable event.
- Distributions, either withdrawals or loans, that result in a gain will be subject to a 10% penalty tax if the policy owner is under the age of 59.5 (this can be avoided by the use of a 72(v) distribution).
- Transferring funds from a Modified Endowment Contract to a new life insurance policy via the 1035 exchange privilege will render the newly issued contract as Modified Endowment Contract as well.

The rules for determining whether a life insurance contract is or is not a MEC are also set forth in IRC Section 7702A and involve a comparison of the actual premiums paid during the first seven years versus a hypothetical "Seven Pay Premium" computed using actuarial mathematics and the interest and mortality guaranteed under the contract. There are many complexities and special circumstances, so much so that the Society of Actuaries dedicates a great deal of ink to the topic in its quarterly newsletter called Taxing Times

== Use ==
In some cases, such as for estate planning, a person may purposely create a modified endowment contract in order to purchase the least insurance and therefore have the lowest insurance costs possible in order to receive the desired benefit. It may be used to pass more money on to heirs.

== See also ==
Endowment policy
