= Whole life insurance =

Permanent life insurance with fixed premiums and guaranteed cash-value accumulation

Whole life insurance, or whole of life assurance (in the Commonwealth of Nations), sometimes called "straight life" or "ordinary life", is a life insurance policy that is guaranteed to remain in force for the insured's entire lifetime, provided required premiums are paid, or possibly until the policy maturity date at an advanced age. As a life insurance policy, it represents a contract between the insured and insurer stating that, as long as contract terms are met, the insurer will pay the death benefit of the policy to the designated beneficiaries upon the insured's death.

Because whole life policies are guaranteed to remain active for the life of the insured as long as required premiums are paid, initial premiums are typically higher than those for term life insurance, where premiums are fixed only for a limited term. Whole life premiums are fixed at issue based on the issue age and do not increase as the insured ages. The insured party normally pays premiums until death, except for limited-pay policies, which can be fully paid up in a specified number of years (e.g., 10 or 20 years) or at a specific age (such as age 65). Whole life insurance belongs to the cash value category of permanent life insurance, which also includes universal life insurance, variable universal life insurance, and endowment policies.

== Death benefit ==
The death benefit of a whole life policy is normally the stated face amount. However, if the policy is "participating", the benefit may be increased by accumulated dividend values or decreased by outstanding policy loans. Certain policy riders, such as an accidental death benefit rider, may also increase the payout under specified circumstances.

In contrast to universal life policies—which offer flexible premiums and may be structured to pay cash values in addition to the face amount—traditional whole life insurance guarantees lifetime coverage for a fixed premium schedule.

== Maturity ==
A whole life policy reaches "maturity" upon the death of the insured or when the insured reaches the maturity age specified in the contract (historically age 100 in the United States). In the United States, modern policies issued since 2009 commonly use age 120 as the maturity threshold to reflect increased life expectancy. The policy becomes a "matured endowment" if the insured survives past the maturity age, at which point the policy owner receives the policy face amount in cash. In the United States, extending maturity ages helps preserve the tax-free status of the death benefit, whereas a matured endowment payout may incur income tax obligations.

== Taxation ==
In most jurisdictions, including the United States, the death benefit of a whole life policy paid to a beneficiary is generally exempt from ordinary income tax. This exemption extends to internal gain accumulated within the cash value prior to payout.

However, if a policy is surrendered prior to death, any proceeds exceeding total premiums paid are taxable as ordinary income. Policyholders often access accumulated cash value via policy loans rather than surrendering the contract, as loan proceeds are generally non-taxable as long as the policy remains active. If a policy lapses or is surrendered with outstanding loans, any loan amount in excess of the cumulative premium basis is subject to income tax.

While death benefits are typically exempt from income tax, they may be subject to estate taxes if the insured retains "incidents of ownership" in the policy at the time of death. Irrevocable life insurance trusts (ILITs) are commonly utilized in estate planning to exclude policy proceeds from the gross estate.

== Uses ==
=== Personal and family uses ===
Whole life insurance is primarily used to cover permanent or long-term financial obligations, including:

- Funeral and final administrative expenses,
- Estate liquidity and estate tax obligations,
- Income replacement for a surviving spouse, and
- Supplemental retirement planning.

Due to relatively high initial premium requirements compared to term life insurance, whole life is less commonly used for short-term or temporary financial needs, such as covering temporary personal debt or income protection during child-rearing years.

=== Business uses ===
Businesses utilize whole life insurance contracts for specific structural and executive planning purposes, such as:

1. Funding buy-sell agreements among business partners,
2. Key person insurance to indemnify against the death of a critical employee,
3. Supplemental Executive Retirement Plans (SERP), and
4. Non-qualified deferred compensation plans.

== Level premium system ==
Level premium whole life insurance maintains a constant premium rate throughout the lifetime of the policy. While early-year premiums are significantly higher than the actual mortality cost at younger ages, this structure builds a cash reserve that offsets higher mortality costs in advanced age.

The contract guarantees that the policy accumulates a cash value reserve. Policyholders may access this value via policy loans. If a policy loan remains unpaid at the time of the insured's death, the outstanding principal and accrued interest are subtracted from the total death benefit paid to the beneficiary.

While life insurance actuaries note that the primary purpose of life insurance is risk transfer rather than pure savings, the guaranteed cash accumulation offers tax-deferred growth benefits.

=== Reserves ===
Insurance regulations require legal reserve life insurance companies to maintain reserve liabilities against promised future benefits. These reserves represent statutory obligations owed to policyholders and are largely invested in conservative institutional financial assets, such as high-grade corporate and government debt instruments.

== Cash values ==
Cash values reflect the legal reserves allocated to maintain policy guarantees. Under standard non-forfeiture regulations, a policyholder who surrenders a policy is entitled to receive its accumulated surrender value in one of three ways:

1. Cash payout,
2. Reduced paid-up insurance (a lower coverage amount requiring no further premiums), or
3. Extended term insurance (full face value coverage for a specified term).

Cash values in traditional policies accumulate at a contractually guaranteed interest rate. Participating policies may also earn annual policy dividends based on company performance.

== Pricing methods ==
=== Non-participating ===
In a non-participating policy, all values (premiums, cash values, and death benefits) are fixed at issue. The insurer assumes all actuarial risk regarding mortality rates, administrative costs, and investment performance. Non-participating contracts are typically offered by stock life insurance companies.

=== Participating ===
In a participating policy (commonly issued by mutual insurance companies), policyholders share in the insurer's divisible surplus through annual policy dividends. Dividends are legally classified as a non-taxable return of premium overcharge. Dividend options include receiving cash, reducing future premiums, or purchasing paid-up additional coverage to increase cash value and death benefit growth.

Historical dividend tracking shows that long-held participating policies could yield annual dividends exceeding base premiums.

=== Indeterminate premium ===
Indeterminate premium policies feature adjustable premium rates based on current economic assumptions, subject to a maximum guaranteed premium cap defined in the contract.

== Variations ==
=== Limited pay ===
Limited-pay whole life policies require premium payments for a designated period (e.g., 10, 20, or 30 years, or up to age 65), after which the policy remains in force for life without further payments required.

=== Single premium ===
Single-premium whole life involves a single lump-sum premium paid at inception, fully funding the policy immediately.

=== Interest-sensitive ===
Interest-sensitive whole life policies credit interest based on prevailing market conditions rather than fixed dividend schedules, while preserving guaranteed minimum floor rates and fixed death benefits.

== Liquidity ==
Accumulated cash values can be accessed on demand via policy loans or cash surrenders. However, outstanding policy loan balances accrue interest and reduce the death benefit payable to beneficiaries if unpaid at the time of the insured's death.

== See also ==
- Life insurance
- Permanent life insurance
