= Separate account =

A separate account is a segregated accounting and reporting account held by an insurance company not in, but rather "separate" from its general account. A separate account allows an investor to choose an investment category according to the investor's individual risk tolerance and desire for performance. An account may be a generic conservative or aggressive investment allocation, or a specific mutual fund-type account. Some offshore companies allow the account owners to specify the type of separate account to open.

Separate accounts in the U.S. markets are often characterized as either managed or non-managed. A managed separate account is synonymous to a mutual fund in the sense that the investments of the separate account are actively managed (such as stocks, bonds or other debt instruments, loans, derivative instruments, etc.). A non-managed separate account is one that invests more "passively" in that it typically owns shares of other managed pools of investments such as mutual fund shares. This is similar to a "fund of funds" whereby the separate account ("fund") simply invests in shares of one or more mutual funds. This arrangement is sometimes more efficient and cost-effective rather than the insurance company maintaining many separate accounts with similar baskets of securities.

Separate accounts are sometimes confused with separately managed accounts (SMAs), which are privately managed investment accounts opened through a brokerage or financial adviser that uses pooled money to buy individual assets. These differ from mutual funds because the investor directly owns the securities instead of owning a share in a pool of securities. Most SMAs require a minimum investment of $100,000 or more.
