= Cash value =

Investment in life insurance

Cash value refers to an investment component in life insurance that grows tax-free over the course of the policy's life. Cash value is a part of permanent life insurance policies and is a living benefit that the policyholder can use during his or her lifetime.

== Cash value life insurance policies ==
Cash values are usually associated with whole life insurance or endowment life insurance and other forms of permanent life insurance. The cash value of a policy increases as the policyholder makes premium payments and earns interest on the payments. Depending on the terms of the policy, the policyholder typically can use the cash value to pay insurance premiums, as collateral on a loan or to meet unexpected expenses.

The contract determines for each possible cancellation date the related cash value. If the investment of premiums is contractually made in an individual account, the cash value is the value of the investments in that account at any particular time minus a surrender charge. If a policyholder dies without using the cash value, the policyholder's beneficiaries will only receive the death benefit and not the cash value.

The cash value will often be similar or even equal to the reserve to be held by the insurance company for the net obligations from the contract. As such, the amount is usually invested and earns investment income for the insurance company which is to some extent forwarded to policyholders of participating contracts.

Since often initial premiums are not invested but covering initial costs associated with selling the contract (upfront or front-end fee), the amount available may be significantly lower than the sum of premiums paid for some time, initially even zero. Later, interest credited might compensate that initial loss.

The value of the investment is often subject to a surrender charge in determining the cash value. A surrender charge offsets the costs associated with selling the contract and allows these contracts to be sold with little or no upfront fees. Surrender charges are imposed when a contract is cancelled within a set time frame. Any cancellations after that time frame is not subject to a surrender charge. Typically surrender charges decrease on an annual schedule until they disappear altogether.

== Guaranteed cash value ==
The determination of the cash value, both the base amount and the applicable surrender charge, in the contract can be explicit by determining the value for each surrender date (guaranteed cash values), by referring to the value of specific investments or subject to the discretion of the insurance company, which is often executed to bring cash values in line with values of the investments of the insurance company. Guaranteed cash values can result in significant risks for the insurance company if the guarantee exceeds the economic value of policyholders' rights under the contract and the value of reserves hold.

== See also ==
- Actual cash value
- Life insurance
- Permanent life insurance
