= Term life insurance =

Life insurance providing coverage for a fixed period with no cash-value component

Term life insurance or term assurance is life insurance that provides coverage at a fixed rate of payments for a limited period of time, the relevant term. After that period expires, coverage at the previous rate of premiums is no longer guaranteed and the client must either forgo coverage or potentially obtain further coverage with different payments or conditions. If the life insured dies during the term, the death benefit will be paid to the beneficiary. Term insurance is typically the least expensive way to purchase a substantial death benefit on a coverage amount per premium dollar basis over a specific period of time.

Term life insurance can be contrasted to permanent life insurance such as whole life, universal life, and variable universal life, which guarantee coverage at fixed premiums for the lifetime of the covered individual unless the policy is allowed to lapse due to failure to pay premiums. Term insurance is not generally used for estate planning needs or charitable giving strategies but is used for pure income replacement needs for an individual. Term insurance functions in a manner similar to most other types of insurance in that it satisfies claims against what is insured if the premiums are up to date and the contract has not expired and does not provide for a return of premium dollars if no claims are filed. As an example, auto insurance will satisfy claims against the insured in the event of an accident and a homeowner policy will satisfy claims against the home if it is damaged or destroyed, for example, by fire. Whether or not these events will occur is uncertain. If the policyholder discontinues coverage because they have sold the insured car or home, the insurance company will not refund the full premium.

== Usage ==
Because term life insurance is a pure death benefit, its primary use is to provide coverage of financial responsibilities for the insured or their beneficiaries. Such responsibilities may include, but are not limited to, consumer debt, dependent care, university education for dependents, funeral costs, and mortgages. Term life insurance may be chosen in favor of permanent life insurance because term insurance is usually much less expensive (depending on the length of the term), even if the applicant is higher risk, such as being an everyday smoker. For example, an individual might choose to obtain a policy whose term expires near their retirement age based on the premise that, by the time the individual retires, they would have amassed sufficient funds in retirement savings to provide financial security for the claims.

== Annual renewable term ==
The simplest form of term life insurance is for a term of one year. The death benefit would be paid by the insurance company if the insured died during the one-year term, while no benefit is paid if the insured dies one day after the last day of the one-year term. The premium paid is then based on the expected probability of the insured dying in that one year.

Because the likelihood of dying in the next year is low for anyone that the insurer would accept for the coverage, purchase of only one year of coverage is rare.

One of the main challenges to renewal experienced with some of these policies is requiring proof of insurability. For instance the insured could acquire a terminal illness within the term, but not actually die until after the term expires. Because of the terminal illness, the purchaser would likely be uninsurable after the expiration of the initial term, and would be unable to renew the policy or purchase a new one.

Some policies offer a feature called guaranteed reinsurability that allows the insured to renew without proof of insurability.

A version of term insurance which is commonly purchased is annual renewable term (ART). In this form, the premium is paid for one year of coverage, but the policy is guaranteed to be able to be continued each year for a given period of years. This period varies from 10 to 30 years, or occasionally until age 95. As the insured ages, the premiums increase with each renewal period, eventually becoming financially inviable as the rates for a policy would eventually exceed the cost of a permanent policy. In this form the premium is slightly higher than for a single year's coverage, but the chances of the benefit being paid are much higher.

=== Basic pricing assumptions for annual renewable term life insurance ===
Actuarially, there are three basic pricing assumptions that go into every type of life insurance:

1. Mortality—How many individuals will die in a given year using a large sample size—EG, The 1980 CSO Mortality Table or the newer 2001 CSO Mortality Table which are compiled by the FDC. Most life insurance companies use their own proprietary mortality experience based on their own internal set of statistics. The CSO Mortality Tables reflect total population figures within the US and do not reflect how a life insurance company screens its applicants for good health during the policy underwriting phase of the policy issue process. Corporate mortality will most likely always be more favorable than CSO tables as a result. In rare cases some companies have recently increased policy mortality costs on existing business segments due to much lower than anticipated investment returns,
2. Assumed Net Investment Return—EG Current industry average return of 5.5% Annual Yield by the life insurance company. In the early 1980s interest/return assumptions were well over 10% to be sustained over the life of the policy.
3. Internal Administrative Expenses—Generally these are proprietary figures which include, mainly, policy acquisition costs (sales commissions to selling agents and brokers), and general home office expenses.

These pricing assumptions are universal among the various types of individual life insurance policies. It's important to understand these components when considering term life insurance because there is no cash accumulation component inherent to this type of policy. Buyers of this type of insurance typically seek the maximum death benefit component with the lowest possible premium.

In the competitive term life insurance market the premium range, for similar policies of the same duration, is quite small. All of the above referenced variations of term life policies are derived from these basic components.

== Payout likelihood and cost difference ==
Both term insurance and permanent insurance use the same mortality tables for calculating the cost of insurance, and provide a death benefit which is income tax free. However, the premium requirement for term insurance is substantially lower for younger individuals than those for permanent insurance.

The reason the costs for term life insurance are substantially lower for younger individuals is due to the low chance they will die during the contracts term. Permanent life insurance programs are designed so the policy owner contributes more premiums than what the cost of insurance is in younger years so that those premiums, and any earning they generate, will offset the cost of insurance in later years when the insured is older and the average mortality rate is higher. The cash value build up in a permanent life insurance is a result of the additional contributions and their earning made to the policy that exceed the cost to insure the individual in any given year.

As a norm from Income Tax under Section 10(10D), when the beneficiary receives the death benefit under a term life insurance policy, they are not subject to pay tax on the amount received. The death benefit received is not added to taxable income. However, any interest that it accumulates over or any estate additions caused by it is liable to be taxed.

Some permanent universal life insurance policies do not accumulate cash values to stay active for long periods of time. These are sometimes referred to as "term-for-life." It is important to understand these policies could expire without value if the insured lives past the stated guaranteed period. The insurance company that manufactures these types of universal life contracts offer the policy owner a guarantee that, as long as premiums are paid on as required, the death benefit will be paid to beneficiaries if the insured dies while the contract is active. If the contract expires and the insured is still living, the life insurance policy ends without value. If the insured person dies and the policy has cash value, the cash value is retained by the insurance company who pays out only the stated death benefit listed on the policy. The beneficiaries do not receive both.

Death benefits are paid out income tax free, in addition to the policy face amount.

== See also ==
- Family income benefit insurance
- Permanent life insurance
- Universal life insurance
- Variable universal life insurance
- Whole life insurance
- Internal Revenue Code section 79
