= Life insurance =

Insurance that pays benefits upon the policyholder's death

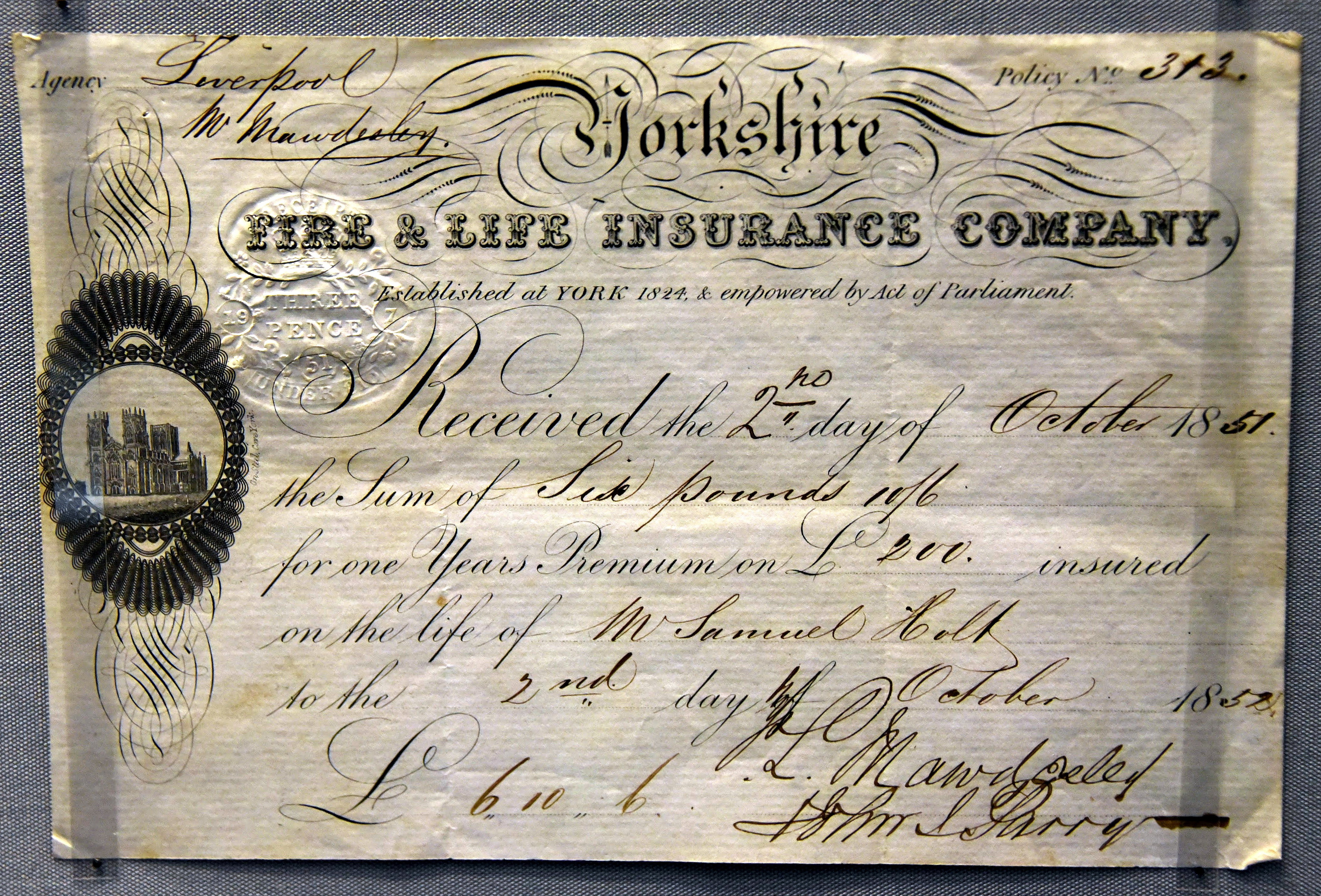
Life insurance certificate issued by the Yorkshire Fire & Life Insurance Company to Samuel Holt, Liverpool, England, 1851. On display at the British Museum in London

Life insurance (or life assurance, especially in the Commonwealth of Nations) is a contract between an insurance policy holder and an insurer or assurer, where the insurer promises to pay a designated beneficiary a sum of money upon the death of an insured person. Depending on the contract, other events such as physical complications or illness can also trigger payment. The policyholder typically pays a premium, either regularly or as one lump sum. The benefits may include other expenses, such as funeral expenses.

Life policies are legal contracts and the terms of each contract describe the limitations of the insured events. Often, specific exclusions written into the contract limit the liability of the insurer; common examples include claims relating to suicide, fraud, war, riot, and civil commotion. Difficulties may arise where an event is not clearly defined, for example, the insured knowingly incurred a risk by consenting to an experimental medical procedure or by taking medication resulting in injury or death.

Life insurers have diversified their product offerings into retirement products such as annuities.

Life-based contracts tend to fall into two major categories:

- Protection policies: designed to provide a benefit, typically a lump-sum payment, in the event of a specified occurrence. A common form of a protection-policy design is term insurance.
- Investment policies: the main objective of these policies is to facilitate the growth of capital by regular or single premiums. Common forms (in the United States) are whole life, universal life, and variable life policies.

== History ==
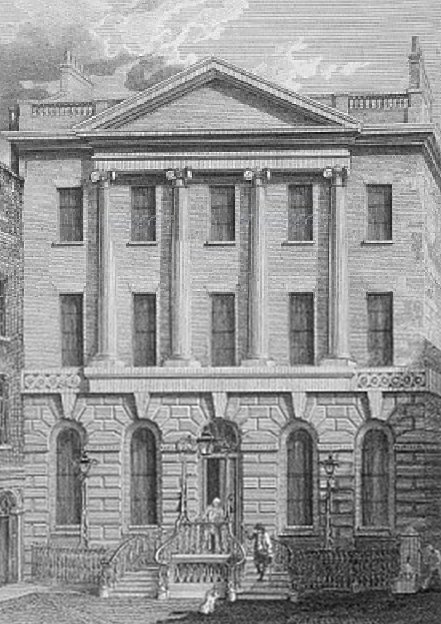
Amicable Society for a Perpetual Assurance Office, established in 1706, was the first life insurance company in the world.

An early form of life insurance dates to Ancient Rome; "burial clubs" covered the cost of members' funeral expenses and assisted survivors financially. In 1816, an archeological excavation in Minya, Egypt (under an Eyalet of the Ottoman Empire) produced a Nerva–Antonine dynasty-era tablet from the ruins of the Temple of Antinous in Antinoöpolis, Aegyptus that prescribed the rules and membership dues of a burial society collegium established in Lanuvium, Italia in approximately 133 AD during the reign of Hadrian (117–138) of the Roman Empire. In 1851, future U.S. Supreme Court Associate Justice Joseph P. Bradley (1870–1892), once employed as an actuary for the Mutual Benefit Life Insurance Company, submitted an article to the Journal of the Institute of Actuaries detailing an historical account of a Severan dynasty-era life table compiled by the Roman jurist Ulpian in approximately 220 AD during the reign of Elagabalus (218–222) that was included in the Digesta seu Pandectae (533) codification ordered by Justinian I (527–565) of the Eastern Roman Empire.

The earliest known life insurance policy was made in Royal Exchange, London on 18 June 1583. A Richard Martin insured a William Gybbons, paying thirteen merchants 30 pounds for 400 if the insured dies within one year. The first company to offer life insurance in modern times was the Amicable Society for a Perpetual Assurance Office, founded in London in 1706 by William Talbot and Sir Thomas Allen. Each member made an annual payment per share on one to three shares with consideration to age of the members being twelve to fifty-five. At the end of the year a portion of the "amicable contribution" was divided among the wives and children of deceased members, in proportion to the number of shares the heirs owned. The Amicable Society started with 2000 members.

The first life table was written by Edmund Halley in 1693, but it was only in the 1750s that the necessary mathematical and statistical tools were in place for the development of modern life insurance. James Dodson, a mathematician and actuary, tried to establish a new company aimed at correctly offsetting the risks of long-term life assurance policies, after being refused admission to the Amicable Life Assurance Society because of his advanced age. He was unsuccessful in his attempts at procuring a charter from the government.

His disciple, Edward Rowe Mores, was able to establish the Society for Equitable Assurances on Lives and Survivorship in 1762. It was the world's first mutual insurer and it pioneered age based premiums based on mortality rate laying "the framework for scientific insurance practice and development" and "the basis of modern life assurance upon which all life assurance schemes were subsequently based".

Mores also gave the name actuary to the chief official—the earliest known reference to the position as a business concern. The first modern actuary was William Morgan, who served from 1775 to 1830. In 1776 the Society carried out the first actuarial valuation of liabilities and subsequently distributed the first reversionary bonus (1781) and interim bonus (1809) among its members. It also used regular valuations to balance competing interests. The Society sought to treat its members equitably and the Directors tried to ensure that policyholders received a fair return on their investments. Premiums were regulated according to age, and anybody could be admitted regardless of their state of health and other circumstances.

The sale of life insurance in the U.S. began in the 1760s. The Presbyterian Synods in Philadelphia and New York City created the Corporation for Relief of Poor and Distressed Widows and Children of Presbyterian Ministers in 1759; Episcopalian priests organized a similar fund in 1769. Between 1787 and 1837 more than two dozen life insurance companies were started, but fewer than half a dozen survived. In the 1870s, military officers banded together to found both the Army (AAFMAA) and the Navy Mutual Aid Association (Navy Mutual), inspired by the plight of widows and orphans left stranded in the West after the Battle of the Little Big Horn, and of the families of U.S. sailors who died at sea.

== Overview ==
=== Parties to contract ===
The person responsible for making payments for a policy is the policy owner, while the insured is the person whose death will trigger payment of the death benefit. The owner and insured may or may not be the same person. For example, if Joe buys a policy on his own life, he is both the owner and the insured. But if Jane, his wife, buys a policy on Joe's life, she is the owner and he is the insured. The policy owner is the guarantor and they will be the person to pay for the policy. The insured is a participant in the contract, but not necessarily a party to it.

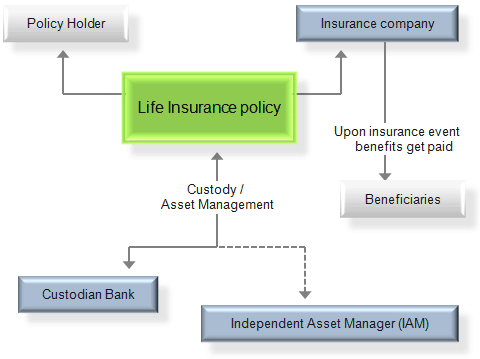
Chart of life insurance

The beneficiary receives policy proceeds upon the insured person's death. The owner designates the beneficiary, but the beneficiary is not a party to the policy. The owner can change the beneficiary unless the policy has an irrevocable beneficiary designation. If a policy has an irrevocable beneficiary, any beneficiary changes, policy assignments, or cash value borrowing would require the agreement of the original beneficiary.

In cases where the policy owner is not the insured (also referred to as the celui qui vit or CQV), insurance companies have sought to limit policy purchases to those with an insurable interest in the CQV. For life insurance policies, close family members and business partners will usually be found to have an insurable interest. The insurable interest requirement usually demonstrates that the purchaser will actually suffer some kind of loss if the CQV dies. Such a requirement prevents people from benefiting from the purchase of purely speculative policies on people they expect to die. With no insurable interest requirement, the risk that a purchaser would murder the CQV for insurance proceeds would be great. In at least one case, an insurance company that sold a policy to a purchaser with no insurable interest (who later murdered the CQV for the proceeds), was found liable in court for contributing to the wrongful death of the victim (Liberty National Life v. Weldon, 267 Ala.171 (1957)).

=== Contract terms ===
Special exclusions may apply, such as suicide clauses, whereby the policy becomes null and void if the insured dies by suicide within a specified time (usually two years after the purchase date; some states provide a statutory one-year suicide clause). Any misrepresentations by the insured on the application may also be grounds for nullification. Most US states, for example, specify a maximum contestability period, often no more than two years. Only if the insured dies within this period will the insurer have a legal right to contest the claim on the basis of misrepresentation and request additional information before deciding whether to pay or deny the claim.

The face amount of the policy is the initial amount that the policy will pay at the death of the insured or when the policy matures, although the actual death benefit can provide for greater or lesser than the face amount. The policy matures when the insured dies or reaches a specified age (such as 100 years old).

=== Costs, insurability, and underwriting ===
The insurance company calculates the policy prices (premiums) at a level sufficient to fund claims, cover administrative costs, and provide a profit. The cost of insurance is determined using mortality tables calculated by actuaries. Mortality tables are statistically based tables showing expected annual mortality rates of people at different ages. As people are more likely to die as they get older, the mortality tables enable insurance companies to calculate the risk and increase premiums with age accordingly. Such estimates can be important in taxation regulation.

In the 1980s and 1990s, the SOA 1975-80 Basic Select & Ultimate tables were the typical reference points, while the 2001 VBT and 2001 CSO tables were published more recently. As well as the basic parameters of age and gender, the newer tables include separate mortality tables for smokers and non-smokers, and the CSO tables include separate tables for preferred classes.

The mortality tables provide a baseline for the cost of insurance, but the health and family history of the individual applicant is also taken into account (except in the case of Group policies). This investigation and resulting evaluation is termed underwriting. Health and lifestyle questions are asked, with certain responses possibly meriting further investigation.

Specific factors that may be considered by underwriters include:

- Personal medical history;
- Family medical history;
- Driving record;
- Height and weight matrix, otherwise known as BMI (Body Mass Index).

Based on the above and additional factors, applicants will be placed into one of several classes of health ratings which will determine the premium paid in exchange for insurance at that particular carrier.

Life insurance companies in the United States support the Medical Information Bureau (MIB), which is a clearing house of information on persons who have applied for life insurance with participating companies in the last seven years. As part of the application, the insurer often requires the applicant's permission to obtain information from their physicians.

Automated Life Underwriting is a technology solution which is designed to perform all or some of the screening functions traditionally completed by underwriters, and thus seeks to reduce the work effort, time and data necessary to underwrite a life insurance application. These systems allow point of sale distribution and can shorten the time frame for issuance from weeks or even months to hours or minutes, depending on the amount of insurance being purchased.

The mortality of underwritten persons rises much more quickly than the general population. At the end of 10 years, the mortality of that 25-year-old, non-smoking male is 0.66/1000/year. Consequently, in a group of one thousand 25-year-old males with a $100,000 policy, all of average health, a life insurance company would have to collect approximately $50 a year from each participant to cover the relatively few expected claims. (0.35 to 0.66 expected deaths in each year × $100,000 payout per death = $35 per policy.) Other costs, such as administrative and sales expenses, also need to be considered when setting the premiums. A 10-year policy for a 25-year-old non-smoking male with preferred medical history may get offers as low as $90 per year for a $100,000 policy in the competitive US life insurance market.

Most of the revenue received by insurance companies consists of premiums, but revenue from investing the premiums forms an important source of profit for most life insurance companies. Group insurance policies are an exception to this.

In the United States, life insurance companies are never legally required to provide coverage to everyone, with the exception of Civil Rights Act compliance requirements. Insurance companies alone determine insurability, and some people are deemed uninsurable. The policy can be declined or rated (increasing the premium amount to compensate for the higher risk), and the amount of the premium will be proportional to the face value of the policy.

Many companies separate applicants into four general categories. These categories are preferred best, preferred, standard, and tobacco. Preferred best is reserved only for the healthiest individuals in the general population. This may mean, that the proposed insured has no adverse medical history, is not under medication, and has no family history of early-onset cancer, diabetes, or other conditions. Preferred means that the proposed insured is currently under medication and has a family history of particular illnesses. Most people are in the standard category.

People in the tobacco category typically have to pay higher premiums due to higher mortality. Recent US mortality tables predict that roughly 0.35 in 1,000 non-smoking males aged 25 will die during the first year of a policy. Mortality approximately doubles for every additional ten years of age, so the mortality rate in the first year for non-smoking men is about 2.5 in 1,000 people at age 65. Compare this with the US population male mortality rates of 1.3 per 1,000 at age 25 and 19.3 at age 65 (without regard to health or smoking status).

=== Death benefits ===
Upon the insured's death, the insurer requires acceptable proof of death before it pays the claim. If the insured's death is suspicious and the policy amount is large, the insurer may investigate the circumstances surrounding the death before deciding whether it has an obligation to pay the claim.

Payment from the policy may be as a lump sum or as an annuity, which is paid in regular installments for either a specified period or for the beneficiary's lifetime.

Death benefits are the primary feature of life insurance policies, and they provide a lump sum payment to the beneficiaries of the policyholder in the event of the policyholder's death. The amount of the death benefit is typically determined at the time the policy is purchased, and it is based on factors such as the policyholder's age, health, and occupation.

The death benefit is only payable if the policyholder dies while the policy is in effect. If the policyholder outlives the policy, the death benefit is not paid, and the policy will typically expire. Some policies may allow the policyholder to receive a portion of the premiums paid if they outlive the policy.

=== Insurance vs assurance ===
The specific uses of the terms "insurance" and "assurance" are sometimes confused. In general, in jurisdictions where both terms are used, "insurance" refers to providing coverage for an event that might happen (fire, theft, flood, etc.), while "assurance" is the provision of coverage for an event that is certain to happen. In the United States, both forms of coverage are called "insurance" for reasons of simplicity in companies selling both products. By some definitions, "insurance" is any coverage that determines benefits based on actual losses whereas "assurance" is coverage with predetermined benefits irrespective of the losses incurred.

Life insurance may be divided into two basic classes: temporary and permanent; or the following subclasses: term, universal, whole life, and endowment life insurance.

=== Term insurance ===
Term assurance provides life insurance coverage for a specified term (usually 10–30 years). Term life insurance policies do not accumulate cash value, but are significantly less expensive than permanent life insurance policies with equivalent face amounts. Policyholders can save to provide for increased term premiums or decrease insurance needs (by paying off debts or saving to provide for survivor needs).

Mortgage life insurance insures a loan secured by real property and usually features a level premium amount for a declining policy face value because what is insured is the principal and interest outstanding on a mortgage that is constantly being reduced by mortgage payments. The face amount of the policy is always the amount of the principal and interest outstanding that are paid should the applicant die before the final installment is paid.

==== Group life insurance ====
Group life insurance (also known as wholesale life insurance or institutional life insurance) is term insurance covering a group of people, usually employees of a company, members of a union or association, or members of a pension or superannuation fund. Individual proof of insurability is not normally a consideration in its underwriting. Rather, the underwriter considers the size, turnover, and financial strength of the group. Contract provisions will attempt to exclude the possibility of adverse selection. Group life insurance often allows members exiting the group to maintain their coverage by buying individual coverage. The underwriting is carried out for the whole group instead of individuals.

=== Permanent life insurance ===
Permanent life insurance is life insurance that covers the remaining lifetime of the insured. A permanent insurance policy accumulates a cash value up to its date of maturation. The owner can access the money in the cash value by withdrawing money, borrowing the cash value, or surrendering the policy and receiving the surrender value.

The three basic types of permanent insurance are whole life, universal life, and endowment.

==== Whole life ====
Whole life insurance provides lifetime coverage for a set premium amount.

==== Universal life coverage ====
Universal life insurance (ULl) is a relatively new insurance product, intended to combine permanent insurance coverage with greater flexibility in premium payments, along with the potential for greater growth of cash values. There are several types of universal life insurance policies, including interest-sensitive (also known as "traditional fixed universal life insurance"), variable universal life (VUL), guaranteed death benefit, and has equity-indexed universal life insurance.

Universal life insurance policies have cash values. Paid-in premiums increase their cash values; administrative and other costs reduce their cash values.

Universal life insurance addresses the perceived disadvantages of whole life—namely that premiums and death benefits are fixed. With universal life, both the premiums and death benefit are flexible. With the exception of guaranteed-death-benefit universal life policies, universal life policies trade their greater flexibility for fewer guarantees.

"Flexible death benefit" means the policy owner can choose to decrease the death benefit. The death benefit can also be increased by the policy owner, usually requiring new underwriting. Another feature of flexible death benefit is the ability to choose option A or option B death benefits and to change those options over the course of the life of the insured. Option A is often referred to as a "level death benefit"; death benefits remain level for the life of the insured, and premiums are lower than policies with Option B death benefits, which pay the policy's cash value—i.e., a face amount plus earnings/interest. If the cash value grows over time, the death benefits do too. If the cash value declines, the death benefit also declines. Option B policies normally feature higher premiums than option A policies.

==== Endowments ====
The endowment policy is a life insurance contract designed to pay a lump sum after a specific term (on its 'maturity') or on death. Typical maturities are ten, fifteen, or twenty years up to a certain age limit. Some policies also pay out in the case of critical illness.

Policies are typically traditional with-profits or unit-linked (including those with unitized with-profits funds).

Endowments can be cashed in early (or surrendered) and the holder then receives the surrender value which is determined by the insurance company depending on how long the policy has been running and how much has been paid into it.

==== Accidental death ====
Accidental death insurance is a type of limited life insurance that is designed to cover the insured should they die as a result of an accident. "Accidents" run the gamut from abrasions to catastrophes but normally do not include deaths resulting from non-accident-related health problems or suicide. Because they only cover accidents, these policies are much less expensive than other life insurance policies.

Such insurance can also be accidental death and dismemberment insurance or AD&D. In an AD&D policy, benefits are available not only for accidental death but also for the loss of limbs or body functions such as sight and hearing.

Accidental death and AD&D policies pay actual benefits only very rarely, either because the cause of death is not covered by the policy or because death occurs well after the accident, by which time the premiums have gone unpaid. Various AD&D policies have different terms and exclusions. Risky activities such as parachuting, flying, professional sports, or military service are often omitted from coverage.

Accidental death insurance can also supplement standard life insurance as a rider. If a rider is purchased, the policy generally pays double the face amount if the insured dies from an accident. This was once called double indemnity insurance. In some cases, triple indemnity coverage may be available.

==== Senior and pre-need products ====
Insurance companies also offer products targeted at niche markets, such as seniors. These policies are often low face value whole life insurance policies, allowing individuals (ages 50-90) to purchase affordable insurance later in life. These may also be marketed as final expense insurance or burial insurance and usually have death benefits between $1,000 and $50,000. A major reason for their popularity is their use of "simplified underwriting". With simplified underwriting, applicants are not required to take a medical exam; approval depends on the applicant's answers to a set of "yes" or "no" health questions as well as a check of their prescription drug history.

Health requirements can vary substantially between exam and no-exam policies. It may be possible for individuals with certain conditions to qualify for one type of coverage and not another..

Pre-need life insurance policies are limited-premium whole life policies that are usually purchased by older applicants, though they are available to everyone. This type of insurance is designed to cover specific funeral expenses that the applicant has designated in a contract with a funeral home. The policy's death benefit is initially based on the funeral cost at the time of prearrangement, and it then typically grows as interest is credited. In exchange for the policy owner's designation, the funeral home typically guarantees that the proceeds will cover the cost of the funeral, no matter when death occurs. Excess proceeds may go either to the insured's estate, a designated beneficiary, or the funeral home as set forth in the contract. Purchasers of these policies usually make a single premium payment at the time of prearrangement, but some companies also allow premiums to be paid over as much as ten years.

== Related products ==
Riders are modifications to the insurance policy added at the same time the policy is issued. These riders change the basic policy to provide some features desired by the policy owner. A common rider is accidental death. Another common rider is a premium waiver, which waives future premiums if the insured becomes disabled.

Joint life insurance is either term or permanent life insurance that insures two or more persons, with proceeds payable on the death of either.

=== Unit-linked insurance plans ===
Unit-linked insurance plans are unique insurance plans which are similar to mutual funds and term insurance plans combined as one product. The investor does not participate in the profits of the plan per se but gets returns based on the returns on the chosen funds.

=== With-profits policies ===
Some policies afford the policyholder a share of the profits of the insurance company—these are termed with-profits policies. Other policies provide no rights to a share of the profits of the company—these are non-profit policies.

With-profit policies are used as a form of collective investment scheme to achieve capital growth. Other policies offer a guaranteed return not dependent on the company's underlying investment performance; these are often referred to as without-profit policies, which may be construed as a misnomer.

== Taxation ==
=== India ===
According to section 80C of the Income Tax Act, 1961 (now to be replaced by Section 123 of Income Tax Act, 2025 with effect from 01.04.2026) premiums paid towards a valid life insurance policy can be exempted from the taxable income. Along with life insurance premiums, section 80C allows an exemption for other financial instruments such as Employee Provident Fund (EPF), Public Provident Fund (PPF), Equity Linked Savings Scheme (ELSS), National Savings Certificate (NSC), and health insurance premiums are some of them. The total amount that can be exempted from the taxable income for section 80C is capped at a maximum of INR 150,000. The exemptions are eligible for individuals (Indian citizens) or Hindu Undivided Family (HUF).

Apart from tax benefit under section 80C, in India, a policy holder is entitled for a tax exemption on the death benefit received. The received amount is fully exempt from Income Tax under Section 10(10D).

=== Australia ===
Where the life insurance is provided through a superannuation fund, contributions made to fund insurance premiums are tax deductible for self-employed persons and substantially self-employed persons and employers. However, where life insurance is held outside of the superannuation environment, the premiums are generally not tax deductible. For insurance through a superannuation fund, the annual deductible contributions to the superannuation funds are subject to age limits. These limits apply to employers making deductible contributions. They also apply to self-employed persons and substantially self-employed persons. Included in these overall limits are insurance premiums. This means that no additional deductible contributions can be made for the funding of insurance premiums. Insurance premiums can, however, be funded by undeducted contributions. For further information on deductible contributions see "under what conditions can an employer claim a deduction for contributions made on behalf of their employees?" and "what is the definition of substantially self-employed?". The insurance premium paid by the superannuation fund can be claimed by the fund as a deduction to reduce the 15% tax on contributions and earnings. (Ref: ITAA 1936, Section 279).

=== South Africa ===
Premiums paid by a policyholder are not deductible from taxable income, although premiums paid via an approved pension fund registered in terms of the Income Tax Act are permitted to be deducted from personal income tax (whether these premiums are nominally being paid by the employer or employee). The benefits arising from life assurance policies are generally not taxable as income to beneficiaries (again in the case of approved benefits, these fall under retirement or withdrawal taxation rules from SARS). Investment return within the policy will be taxed within the life policy and paid by the life assurer depending on the nature of the policyholder (whether natural person, company-owned, untaxed, or a retirement fund).

=== United States ===
The tax ramifications of life insurance can be complex. Premiums paid by the policy owner are normally not deductible for federal and state income tax purposes, and death benefit proceeds are not included in gross income for federal and state income tax purposes. This means that for the average payout - just over $200,000 in 2023 - beneficiaries typically collect death benefit payments free of taxes. However, if the payout is large enough to push the policy owner's taxable estate over the lifetime gift and estate tax exemption, it may trigger federal estate taxes. Depending on where the deceased lived, their estate may be taxed at the state level as well.

Cash value increases within the policy are not subject to income taxes unless certain events occur. For this reason, insurance policies can be legal and legitimate tax shelter wherein savings can increase without taxation until the owner withdraws the money from the policy. In flexible-premium policies, large deposits of premiums could cause the contract to be considered a modified endowment contract by the Internal Revenue Service (IRS), which negates many of the tax advantages associated with life insurance. The insurance company, in most cases, will inform the policy owner of this danger before deciding their premium.

In 2018, a fiduciary standard rule on retirement products by the United States Department of Labor posed a possible risk.

=== United Kingdom ===
Premiums are not usually deductible against income tax or corporation tax, however, qualifying policies issued prior to 14 March 1984 do still attract LAPR (Life Assurance Premium Relief) at 15% (with the net premium being collected from the policyholder).

Non-investment life policies do not normally attract either income tax or capital gains tax on a claim. If the policy has an investment element such as an endowment policy, whole of life policy, or an investment bond then the tax treatment is determined by the qualifying status of the policy.

Qualifying status is determined at the outset of the policy if the contract meets certain criteria. Essentially, long-term contracts (10+ years) tend to be qualifying policies and the proceeds are free from income tax and capital gains tax. Single premium contracts and those running for a short term are subject to income tax depending upon the marginal rate in the year a gain is made. All UK insurers pay a special rate of corporation tax on the profits from their life book; this is deemed as meeting the lower rate (20% in 2005-06) of liability for policyholders. Therefore, a policyholder who is a higher-rate taxpayer (40% in 2005-06), or becomes one through the transaction, must pay tax on the gain at the difference between the higher and the lower rate. This gain is reduced by applying a calculation called top-slicing based on the number of years the policy has been held. Although this is complicated, the taxation of life assurance-based investment contracts may be beneficial compared to alternative equity-based collective investment schemes (unit trusts, investment trusts, and OEICs). One feature which especially favors investment bonds is the "5% cumulative allowance"—the ability to draw 5% of the original investment amount each policy year without being subject to any taxation on the amount withdrawn. If not used in one year, the 5% allowance can roll over into future years, subject to a maximum tax-deferred withdrawal of 100% of the premiums payable. The withdrawal is deemed by the HMRC (Her Majesty's Revenue and Customs) to be a payment of capital and therefore, the tax liability is deferred until maturity or surrender of the policy. This is an especially useful tax planning tool for higher rate taxpayers who expect to become basic rate taxpayers at some predictable point in the future, as at this point the deferred tax liability will not result in tax being due.

The proceeds of a life policy will be included in the estate for death duty (in the UK, inheritance tax) purposes. Policies written in trust may fall outside the estate. Trust law and taxation of trusts can be complicated, so any individual intending to use trusts for tax planning would usually seek professional advice from an independent financial adviser or solicitor.

==== Pension term assurance ====
Although available before April 2006, from this date pension term assurance became widely available in the UK. Most UK insurers adopted the name "life insurance with tax relief" for the product. Pension term assurance is effectively normal term life assurance with tax relief on the premiums. All premiums are paid at a net basic rate tax of 22%, and higher-rate taxpayers can gain an extra 18% tax relief via their tax return. Although not suitable for all, PTA briefly became one of the most common forms of life assurance sold in the UK until Chancellor Gordon Brown announced the withdrawal of the scheme in his pre-budget announcement on 6 December 2006.

== Stranger originated ==
Stranger-originated life insurance or STOLI is a life insurance policy that is held or financed by a person who has no relationship to the insured person. Generally, the purpose of life insurance is to provide peace of mind by assuring that financial loss or hardship will be alleviated in the event of the insured person's death. STOLI has often been used as an investment technique whereby investors will encourage someone (usually an elderly person) to purchase life insurance and name the investors as the beneficiary of the policy. This undermines the primary purpose of life insurance, as the investors would incur no financial loss should the insured person die. In some jurisdictions, there are laws to discourage or prevent STOLI.

== Criticism ==
Although some aspects of the application process (such as underwriting and insurable interest provisions) make it difficult, life insurance policies have been used to facilitate exploitation and fraud. In the case of life insurance, there is a possible motive to purchase a life insurance policy, particularly if the face value is substantial, and then murder the insured. Usually, the larger the claim or the more serious the incident, the larger and more intense the ensuing investigation by police and insurer investigators. Multiple fictional and non-fictional works, including books, films, television series and podcasts have featured the scenario as a plot device or actually occurring as a true crime. There was also a documented case in Los Angeles in 2006 where two elderly women were accused of taking in homeless men and assisting them. As part of their assistance, they took out life insurance for the men. After the contestability period ended on the policies, the women are alleged to have had the men killed via hit-and-run vehicular homicide.

On April 17, 2016, a report by Lesley Stahl on 60 Minutes claimed that life insurance companies do not pay significant numbers of beneficiaries. This is because many people named as beneficiaries never submit claims to the insurance companies upon the death of the insured, and are unaware that any benefit exists to be claimed, though the insurance companies have full knowledge. The amounts of such benefits are often small, but the numbers of would-be beneficiaries are quite large. These unclaimed benefits eventually become sources of profit.

== See also ==
- Corporate-owned life insurance
- Critical illness insurance
- Economic capital
- Estate planning
- Financial risk management § Insurance
- General insurance
- Insurance fraud
- Internal Revenue Code section 79
- Life expectancy
- Life settlement
- Pet insurance
- Retirement planning
- Return of premium life insurance
- Segregated funds
- Servicemembers' Group Life Insurance
- Term life insurance
- Tontine
