= Repayment mortgage =

Type of mortgage in the United Kingdom

A repayment mortgage is a term generally used in the UK to describe a mortgage in which the monthly repayments consist of repaying the capital amount borrowed as well as the accrued interest, so that the amount borrowed decreases throughout the term and by the end of the loan term has been fully repaid.

This contrasts with an interest-only mortgage (such as an endowment mortgage or some types of balloon payment mortgage) where monthly repayments are for interest, and the borrower must repay the full loan at term in a lump sum.

By reducing the mortgage balance during the term, repayment mortgages can increase home equity if property values are unchanged, although falling house prices can still produce negative equity.

== Definition and terminology ==
In UK mortgage terminology, a repayment mortgage is also called a capital and repayment or capital-and-interest mortgage. It repays both the amount borrowed (capital) and interest through regular payments over the agreed term.

In this context, capital is defined as the money borrowed and interest as the charge made by the lender on the amount owed. Repayment mortgages and interest-only mortgages are the two main types of mortgage in the UK, distinguished by whether regular repayments reduce the capital or cover only interest.

== Equity, loan-to-value and negative equity ==
Equity is the difference between the value of a property and the amount remaining on the mortgage. Negative equity occurs when the mortgage balance exceeds the property's value. Equity can increase if the mortgage balance falls or if the property's value rises.

Because a repayment mortgage reduces the mortgage balance as principal is repaid, it can increase equity and reduce the loan-to-value ratio (LTV) if the property value is unchanged. LTV is defined as the amount borrowed compared with the value of the property, and a lower LTV is likely to attract a lower interest rate because the lender takes less risk with a smaller loan.

Borrowers with interest-only mortgages are more exposed to negative equity risk than borrowers with repayment mortgages because their regular payments do not reduce the debt. A fall in house prices can still leave a repayment mortgage in negative equity, which can be a potential problem when moving home or seeking a new mortgage deal.

== How repayment works ==
Repayment mortgages are repaid using an amortisation schedule. Interest is charged on the outstanding balance, and each scheduled payment includes both interest and repayment of principal. In such a schedule, the interest for each period is calculated by applying the periodic interest rate to the previous period's remaining balance.

For a loan principal $P$, periodic interest rate $i$ and $n$ equal payments, the level payment $M$ is:
$$M = \frac{Pi}{1-(1+i)^{-n}}$$

For each payment period, the interest portion equals the previous period's balance multiplied by $i$. The principal portion equals $M$ minus that interest amount, and the remaining balance equals the previous balance minus the principal portion. The interest portion of each payment falls as the remaining balance declines, while the principal portion rises, so the outstanding balance is reduced to zero by the end of the term.

== Comparison with interest-only and related UK products ==
In a repayment mortgage, regular payments reduce the principal as well as paying interest. In an interest-only mortgage, the monthly payments cover interest only and the principal is repaid separately at the end of the term. MoneyHelper states that interest-only borrowers use savings, investments or other assets (a "repayment plan") to repay the capital at the end of the mortgage term.

An endowment mortgage is a form of interest-only mortgage in which the borrower also pays into an endowment policy intended to repay the principal at the end of the term. The House of Commons Library notes that endowment policies were used as mortgage repayment vehicles in the United Kingdom from the mid-1980s to the 1990s and that policies later matured below their target value, leaving homeowners with shortfalls to address.

== See also ==
- UK mortgage terminology
- Interest-only mortgage
- Endowment mortgage
- Amortization
