= The Equitable Life Assurance Society =

British life insurance company

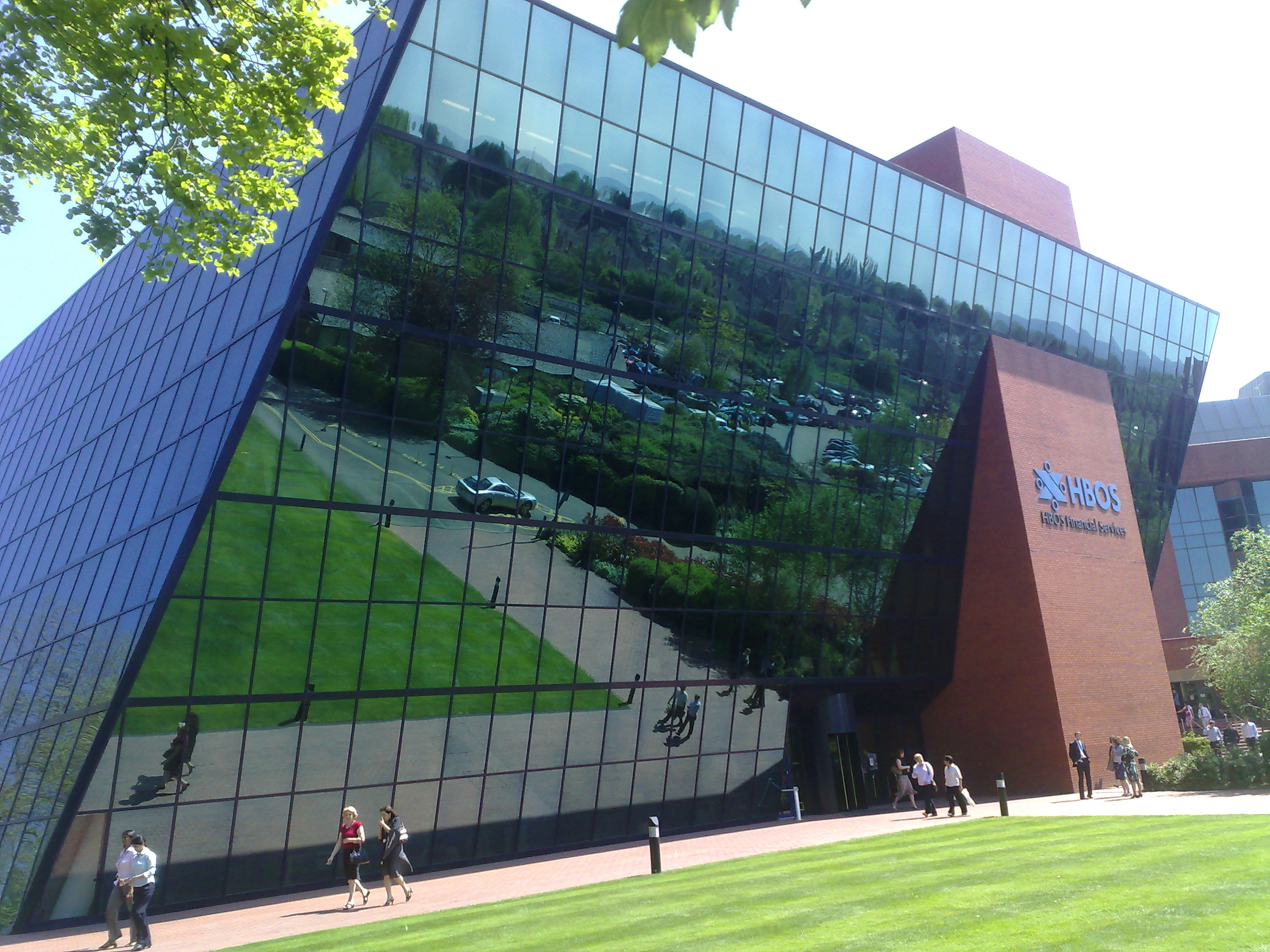
- Head office in Walton Street, Aylesbury opened in 1983
- Type: Subsidiary
- Industry: Financial services
- Founded: 1762
- Headquarters: Aylesbury, England, UK
- Key people: Mike Merrick - Chairman
- Parent: Utmost Life and Pensions
- Website: www.equitable.co.uk

The Equitable Life Assurance Society (Equitable Life), founded in 1762, is a life insurance company in the United Kingdom. The world's oldest mutual insurer, it pioneered age-based premiums based on mortality rate, laying "the framework for scientific insurance practice and development" and "the basis of modern life assurance upon which all life assurance schemes were subsequently based". After closing to new business in 2000, parts of the business were sold off and the remainder of the company became a subsidiary of Utmost Life and Pensions in January 2020.

At its peak in the 1990s, Equitable had 1.5 million policyholders with funds worth £26 billion under management, but it had allowed large unhedged liabilities to accumulate in respect of guaranteed fixed returns to investors without making provision for adverse market changes. Many policyholders lost half their life savings, and the company came close to collapse.

Following a July 2000 House of Lords ruling and the failure of attempts to find a buyer for the business, it closed to new business in December 2000 and reduced payouts to existing members. Lord Penrose's 2004 Equitable Life Inquiry found that the company had made over-generous payouts leading it to be under-funded. A 2007 European report concluded that regulators had focused on solvency margins and failed to consider the increasing risk of accrued terminal bonuses. In 2010, government announced compensation to policy-holders of £1.5bn.

In June 2018, Equitable Life announced that Life Company Consolidation Group (now Utmost Life and Pensions) had agreed to buy the company for £1.8bn, with most policies to be transferred to Utmost's Reliance Life subsidiary and converted to unit-linked. Some of the proceeds of the sale would be returned to the remaining 400,000 policyholders in the form of increased bonuses on their policies. The sale completed at the end of 2019.

== History ==
The society, established via a deed of trust in September 1762 with the name of the "Society for Equitable Assurances on Lives and Survivorships", offered both whole life and fixed term policies. Premiums, which were constant for the duration of the policy, were based on a method devised by the mathematician James Dodson using mortality figures for Northampton and the amount payable on death, the basic sum assured, was guaranteed, a major advantage at the time. As Dodson had died five years earlier, Edward Rowe Mores became its chief executive officer with the title of actuary—the first use of the term—though he was an administrator rather than a statistician. The first modern actuary, William Morgan, was appointed in 1775 and served until 1830. In 1776 the Society carried out the first actuarial valuation of liabilities and subsequently distributed the first reversionary bonus (1781) and interim bonus (1809) among its members. It also used regular valuations to balance competing interests. Its products therefore met the description of a modern with-profits policy.

The society sought to treat its members equitably and the directors tried to ensure that the policyholders received a fair return on their respective investments. Throughout the society's history, the allocation of bonuses (at regular intervals of up to five years) was a carefully thought-through decision based on actuarial advice, designed to promote fairness and equity between different groups and generations of policyholders.

Its methods were successful enough for it to be able to reduce its premiums by 10% in 1777, and there was a further reduction in 1781. By 1799 the society had assets of £4m and its 5,000 membership subsequently doubled to 10,000 in 1810. Famous 19th-century policyholders included Samuel Taylor Coleridge, William Wilberforce and Sir Walter Scott.

The Life Assurance Companies Act 1870 (33 & 34 Vict. c. 61) was passed, "requiring all life offices to publish financial data on the lines so long followed by the Equitable."

In the 20th century, Henry Manly devised the concept and theory of staff pensions, which the society marketed from 1913. Pensions became available to the self-employed in 1957 when the society launched the Retirement annuity plan. Corporate pension scheme members included employees of the NHS, Unilever and the Post Office.

=== Organisation ===
The society's first offices were in the parsonage of St Nicholas Acons in Nicholas Lane, London, moving to Blackfriars in 1774. Approval of policies, the main business of the Society, was undertaken by the Court of Directors; whilst resolutions had to be approved at two meetings of the General Court which all members were entitled to attend. From 1786 this court also dealt with grievances, and there was early tension between initial subscribers wanting a return on investment and those wanting to recruit new members. In 1816 a waiting period was introduced for new members, and only the oldest 5,000 policies were entitled to bonuses. In 1893 the memorandum and articles of association were adopted, incorporating the society as "The Equitable Life Assurance Society" and transferring power to the directors; the 1816 membership and bonus restrictions were removed.

The society moved to Mansion House Street in 1863, to Coleman Street in 1924 (both in the City of London) and then to new offices, opened by Prince Richard, Duke of Gloucester, in Walton Street in Aylesbury in January 1983. The archives of the society from 1762 to 1975 are held by the Institute of Actuaries.

The society acquired the University Life Assurance Society and the Reversionary Interest Society in 1919 and the Equitable Reversionary Interest Society in 1920.

== Guaranteed Annuity Rates, Article 65 and the 1999 Hyman case ==
Many of Equitable's with-profits policies were designed to provide a pension for the policyholder on retirement, and the lump sum available to buy an annuity depended on the sum assured, the reversionary bonuses and the larger terminal bonus. Both types of bonus were allocated at the discretion of the directors in accordance with Article 65 of the Articles of Association, the total being intended to reflect the investment return earned over the lifetime of the policy, subject to smoothing. Between 1956 and the advent of Personal Pension Schemes in July 1988, Equitable sold policies with an option to choose at the retirement date between a fixed Guaranteed Annuity Rate (GAR) or the Current Annuity Rate (i.e. the market annuity rate at that time) (CAR). The latter reflected the anticipated investment return on the lump sum over the annuity holder's lifetime and often changed depending on long-term interest yields and views on future longevity. No additional premium was charged in respect of the guarantee.

In 1979, legislation allowed the lump sum to be transferred to another annuity provider. As a result, communications with policyholders increasingly focused on the lump sum rather than annuity benefits.

The GAR was calculated using an interest yield of 4% per annum until 1975 when it was increased to 7%. By May 2001, of Equitable's 1.1m policyholders about 16% held a GAR option.

During the 1980s and 1990s Equitable experienced a further period of rapid growth. It developed market-leading personal pension and additional voluntary contribution plans while maintaining its record of operating with one of the lowest expense ratios in the industry. Its success was "partly based on its reputation, its strategy of paying no commissions to insurance agents or independent advisers and its tactic of always keeping reserves low and returning to its members more money than other companies".

In 1993 the CAR fell below the guaranteed annuity rate, thus prompting GAR policyholders to exercise their rights. According to actuary Christopher Headdon, policies issued from 1975 to 1988 were worth approximately 25% more than CARs; the total difference amounted to some £1 billion to £1.5 billion.

Based on an affidavit sworn by Christopher Headdon on 28 June 1999, "from the 1980s onwards, Equitable was aware of the GAR risk. ... At no time did Equitable ever hedge or reinsure adequately against the GAR risk to counteract it. The reason for this was Equitable's belief that it could ... neutralise the potential effect of the GAR risk through the exercise of its discretion to allocate final bonuses under Article 65" (of the Articles of Association).

In 1994, Equitable exercised its discretion under that Article to reduce the terminal bonus of those policies with Guaranteed Annuity Rates, negating the benefit from the guarantee but preserving the assets of non-GAR policyholders.

By July 1998 there were a number of complaints to the Personal Investment Authority ombudsman and it was decided to seek a declaratory judgment. David Hyman was selected as the representative policyholder. Hearings started in July 1999, and in September the High Court ruled in the Equitable's favour; but this was reversed by the Appeal Court in January 2000. The Equitable now sought a ruling by the House of Lords.

=== House of Lords ruling on the Hyman case ===
On 20 July 2000 the House of Lords upheld the Appeal Court ruling. They concluded that GAR policies required that the guaranteed rate was applied to calculate the contractual annuity; and that the effect of the differential terminal bonus rates was that the annuity was calculated at current annuity rates, not at the guaranteed rate, and was not lawful. "The self-evident commercial object of the inclusion of guaranteed rates in the policy is to protect the policyholder against a fall in market annuity rates ... The supposition of the parties must be presumed to have been that the directors would not exercise their discretion [in Article 65] in conflict with contractual rights."

Even before that stage, Equitable, which had long claimed to be more transparent than its rivals, had assets worth £3 billion less than communications with policyholders had indicated.

== Aftermath of the Hyman case and partial sales, 2001–9 ==
Having not insured against losing the case, and with no other way to make provision for the immediate £1.5 billion increase in long-term liabilities, Equitable put itself up for sale. By the end of July, about ten companies, including the Prudential, had considered, but rejected a bid. Equitable had intended using money from the sale to allocate bonuses for the first seven months of 2000, but now this was not available.

On 8 December 2000 it closed to new business, and immediately set a Market Value Adjustment of 10% which was later increased to 15%.

On 19 December, HM Treasury announced a review of the Financial Services Authority (FSA)'s regulation of Equitable. The following day, Equitable announced that their President and seven non-executive directors would step down. Vanni Treves became Chairman in March 2001, with Charles Thomson as Chief Executive.

On 4 February 2001 the Halifax agreed to buy Equitable's operating assets, salesforce and non-profit business for a payment of up to £1 billion into the with-profits fund, subject to policyholder agreement. On 20 September 2001, compromise proposals were published offering 17.5% increase for GARs in exchange for the guarantee and 2.5% for non-GARs in exchange for abandoning any legal claim. The deal was accepted by 98% of GAR policyholders, and was sanctioned by the High Court in February 2002.

Both groups of policyholders (those whose pensions had vested and those that had not) received further bad news. In July 2001 deferred pensioners (the second group) were angered to be told their savings had been reduced by 16%, and then in November 2002 pensioners were told that "with-profits annuities, like yours, are now out of line by about 30%." 50,000 annuitants suffered a 20% reduction in income.

In February 2007, Equitable completed the transfer of £4.6 billion of annuities to Canada Life, and in November transferred all £1.8 billion of with-profits annuity policies to Prudential, a deal accepted by 98% of members voting at a meeting.

In November 2008, Equitable announced that the sale of the Society would be put on hold and that the Board would instead review the arrangements to run off its existing business. Gross assets as of December 2008 were £8,754 million, around 25% of the value in 2000.

Treves stepped down as chairman in September 2009 and was replaced by Ian Brimecome.

== 2001 reports by the actuarial profession and FSA ==
In May 2001, Ian Glick QC and Richard Snowden published their joint opinion on behalf of the Financial Services Authority. This concluded that there was an arguable case that the Equitable had breached the rules of its former regulators, the Life Assurance and Unit Trust Regulatory Organisation (Lautro) and the Personal Investment Authority (PIA) in failing to disclose the risk of the existing GAR policies in the Product Particulars, Key Features and With-Profits Guide to new non-GAR policy holders.

This was followed in September by the Corley Report on behalf of the Institute of Actuaries, which recommended, amongst other things, that the Appointed Actuary should require that there is a process for reviewing communications to policyholders, and should resist holding a dual role as Chief Executive, and that his work should be subject to peer review.

In October, the Baird Report was published. This covered the Financial Services Authority's regulation of Equitable from 1 January 1999 to 8 December 2000, when the Society closed to new business. The report was produced by the FSA's director of internal audit with the help of independent accountants and lawyers. The review found that – with hindsight – there had been some "deficiencies" on the part of the FSA in the discharge of their regulatory responsibilities, but also stated that "the die had been cast" by the time the FSA had assumed regulatory responsibility for the Society, in relation to those who had already invested in Equitable.

== The Penrose report, 2004 ==
The Penrose report, commissioned by the Treasury in August 2001 and expected in 2002, was finally published in March 2004 after delays due to vetting by Treasury lawyers. The 818-page report found that the company had made over-generous payouts to policyholders, reaching the stage where "The Society was under-funded to the extent of £4½ billion in the summer of 2001" (chapter 19, para 82). Lord Penrose said: "Principally, the Society was author of its own misfortunes. Regulatory system failures were secondary factors". He also accused the former Equitable management team of "dubious" practices and nurturing a "culture of manipulation and concealment". The Report was debated in parliament on 24 March 2004.

== European Parliament investigation, 2007 ==
In June 2007 the European Parliament issued a 385-page report on Equitable Life. Its fifteen-month investigation followed the implementation in July 2004 of EC Directive 92/96/EEC (the Third Life Directive or 3LD), which governs the single market in life insurance. This directive required the UK, where Equitable's headquarters were, to supervise its "entire business", and curtailed the supervisory power of other EU countries where Equitable operated.

The EU Parliament's remit was to investigate, without prejudice, alleged breaches of Community law in relation to the collapse, to assess the UK regulatory regime in respect of Equitable Life, and to look at the adequacy of remedies available to policyholders including the 15,000 non-UK members. The 22-member committee heard evidence from 38 witnesses and analysed 92 public documents, and its report is the only one completely independent of UK Government influence. Whilst a detailed summary of the full document is well outside the scope of this article, an examination of the effectiveness of the supervision of Equitable is given below and closely follows the wording.

- Financial supervision covering the Assurance undertaking's entire business.

The evidence suggests that the regulator focused exclusively on solvency margins, and took little or no account of accrued terminal bonuses in its overall analysis of the financial health of the company. It quotes Penrose as saying that the Policyholders' Reasonable Expectations (PRE) would have included terminal bonus even if the amount was not defined; however the Government Actuary's Department (GAD) and the Treasury deny PRE existed as the terminal bonus was not guaranteed.

The report goes on to say that if it is considered that these types of bonuses are an integral part of the company's "entire business", the regulatory authorities should have taken them into account. Although the regulator was given the option of not forcing Equitable to build reserves for discretionary bonuses, that did not absolve the authorities from their duty of financial supervision covering the "assurance undertaking's entire business".

- Every insurance company is required to have sound administrative and accounting procedures and adequate internal control mechanisms. Though the Appointed Actuary (AA) is not a role required by the directive, it was an essential part of the UK's own system of insurance regulation. Inter alia, the AA was required to act as a guardian of policyholders' interests; but the overall evidence suggests that "the UK regulator did not fulfil its obligation ... in that Roy Ranson became CEO without relinquishing his role as the Appointed Actuary." The Treasury rejected this claim as the 3LD does not mention the AA.

The overall evidence received suggested that by not taking swift action on this matter, the UK regulator did not fulfil its obligation to require from Equitable sound administrative and accounting procedures and adequate internal control mechanisms, as required explicitly.

- Ensure that the competent authorities have the powers and means necessary for the supervision of assurance undertakings.

The UK had the legal power to supervise Equitable. The Baird report stated that in January 1999, the total number of staff involved in the Government's prudential regulation of about 200 insurance companies was less than 135.

The Penrose report also states that "the DTI insurance division was ill equipped to participate in the regulatory process. It had inadequate staff and those involved at line supervisor level in particular were not qualified to make any significant contribution to the process. For all practical purposes, scrutiny of the actuarial functioning of life offices was in the hands of GAD until the reorganisation under FSA was in place". More evidence also strongly suggests that the regulator adopted a conscious and deliberate "hands-off" approach with regard to the Equitable case. If this were proven to be the case, it would constitute a breach of the regulator's obligation to ensure the respect of PRE and therefore a breach of the letter and aim of Article 10 of the 3LD. Both the Baird and Penrose reports contain criticisms of the regulator's lack of a "pro-active approach".

In its conclusion on p. 117, the report said that the powers bestowed on the Secretary of State (as prescribed by Section 68 of the Insurance Companies Act 1982) to waive the application of prudential regulations appear to be incompatible with the letter and the aim of the Directive, and were used inappropriately (particularly when granting authorisation on numerous occasions to include future profits in the assets available to meet the solvency margin), and that therefore ... there are serious concerns that the 3LD was not correctly transposed in full.

"The committee is of the opinion that the application of the 3LD by the UK in respect of the ELAS case was deficient and that UK regulators and authorities did not adequately respect the ultimate purpose of the Directive."

== Legal actions by Equitable Life, 2005 ==
In April 2005, in the light of Penrose's findings, Equitable started a £2 billion High Court action against auditors Ernst & Young, reduced 3 months later to £0.7 billion, claiming they had failed to inform the directors of the seriousness of its position. However lawyers advised they could not prove that correct advice would have changed the outcome, and the case was dropped in September. Ernst & Young described the case as "ill conceived". Simultaneously, Equitable started a £3.3 billion claim against former directors, claiming that they failed in their duties to policyholders. This claim was abandoned in December 2005; the costs of the two cases amounted to around £40m.

== Government response and the Parliamentary Ombudsman, 2008–09 ==
In July 2008, the Parliamentary and Health Service Ombudsman completed a four-year investigation, described by Equitable's chief executive as the "best chance of compensation". Her 2,819-page report accused the regulators, i.e. the DTI, GAD, and FSA, of "comprehensive failure", found the Government guilty of ten counts of maladministration, and called for a compensation scheme "to put those people who have suffered a relative loss back into the position that they would have been in, had maladministration not occurred". Equitable's chairman estimated that 30,000 policyholders had already died without receiving compensation. In December, the European Parliament issued a press release describing the regulatory failure as an outrage.

In January 2009 the Government issued their response and appointed retired judge Sir John Chadwick as an independent advisor to design an ex-gratia scheme for some policyholders "who have suffered a disproportionate impact as a result of the relevant maladministration".

The Ombudsman accused the government of twisting the findings of her report by suggesting that whatever the regulators had done, it would have made no difference to the events which followed. She also said it had failed to give "cogent reasons" for rejecting some of her findings, mandatory since the Pensions Action Group Judicial Review. In March, the Public Administration Select Committee issued a second report in which it described the government response as "morally unacceptable", and repeated the Ombudsman's criticism that it had acted as judge on its own behalf.

In May, the Ombudsman issued a supplementary report to the government's reply. In August 2009, Chadwick issued an interim report.

== Government response, 2010 ==
In the Queen's Speech following the formation of a Conservative-LibDem coalition government in 2010, the Equitable Life (Payments) Bill was announced. The bill sought to secure compensation for nearly a million policyholders (UK-wide) hit by the near-collapse of the insurer. The Government also announced that the final report from Sir John Chadwick in relation to Equitable Life would be received by mid-July. A statement on the HM Treasury website confirmed two elements of the design of the scheme: that there should be no means testing, and that the dependents of deceased policyholders should be included in the scheme.

The July 2010 announcement by Mark Hoban, the Financial Secretary to the Treasury, offered compensation starting by mid-2011 to 1.5m savers. However, policyholder compensation would be limited to the "absolute loss they suffered" estimated by Chadwick at a total of £2.3-£3B, compared with the £4B-£4.8B returns that similar companies produced, as calculated by consultants Towers Watson. Sir John, whose report was designed to compensate those who suffered "disproportionately", recommended a payment cap for each policyholder which would reduce total compensation to between £400m and £500m. Hoban said compensation would follow recommendations of the Parliamentary Ombudsman report and would take Sir John's findings into account, but might be affected by public spending cuts. Total compensation would be announced in the public spending review in October. Equitable Life pressure group EMAG were unhappy with the announcement but the Ombudsman said she would inform Parliament of her views once she had had time to consider the statement.

Although Equitable's management initially welcomed the announcement, they were concerned that compensation would be based on the Chadwick report, written on the premise that only five of the Ombudsman's findings of maladministration were valid. In opposition, Hoban had promised that all ten counts would be considered. Equitable's Chief Executive, Chris Wiscarson, wrote to Hoban saying that they could not support Chadwick's recommendations as they would only cover about 10% of losses and that compensation should be based on a total figure of £4.8B.

On 20 October 2010, the Chancellor of the Exchequer announced in his Spending Review Statement that the compensation package would be around £1.5billion. However, in 2013, the Commons Public Accounts Committee said that 200,000 people could miss out because of a lack of publicity ahead of the 2014 deadline. The report called on the Treasury and its administrator, National Savings and Investments, to "get their act together" and bring forward publicity for the deadline to July rather than September 2013. By March 2012, payments were only one third of that expected and Committee chairman Margaret Hodge also criticized the Treasury for destroying details of 353,000 policyholders on data protection grounds. In response, a Government Treasury spokesman criticized the Labour party for ignoring the problem for ten years.

== Sale to Utmost, 2019 ==
In June 2018, Equitable Life announced that Life Company Consolidation Group (LCCG) had agreed to buy the company for £1.8bn, with policies to be transferred to LCCG's Reliance Life subsidiary and converted to unit-linked. LCCG (now Utmost Life and Pensions) is backed by Oaktree Capital Management and specialises in buying insurance businesses that are closed to new customers. Some of the proceeds of the sale would be returned to the remaining 400,000 policyholders in the form of increased bonuses on their policies.

The sale required approval by policyholders and the High Court, and, having received this, completed at the end of 2019, with UK policies transferring to Utmost Life and Pensions. Irish and German policies remain with the Equitable Life, now a subsidiary of Utmost Life and Pensions.

== Coat of Arms ==
The College of Arms granted Equitable Life the following coat of arms:

Coat of arms of The Equitable Life Assurance Society

Granted
6 December 1960
Crest
On a wreath of the colours, issuant from a mural crown argent a pelican in her piety proper.
Escutcheon
Gules, a heart Or between six writing pens quilled gold feathered argent.
Supporters
On either side a griffin sable, winged Or, charged on the wing with a fesse undy gules and gorged with a collar gold, 'that of the dexter charged with thistles proper and that of the sinister with roses azure barbed and seeded also proper.
Motto
Sic nos non nobis
