= UK mortgage terminology =

This article gives descriptions of mortgage terminology in the United Kingdom.

== Introduction ==
The UK mortgage market is one of the most innovative and competitive in the world. Most borrowing is funded by either mutual organisations (building societies and credit unions) or proprietary lenders (typically banks). For a number of years the market operated with minimal state intervention, although this changed at least temporarily following the 2008 nationalisation of Northern Rock, which at the time was one of the country's largest mortgage banks.

Since 1982, when the market was substantially deregulated, there has been substantial innovation and diversification of strategies employed by lenders to attract borrowers. This has led to a wide range of mortgage types.

== Mortgage types ==
=== Ways to repay the capital ===
- Repayment mortgage – in principle, and other things being equal, a flat amount is paid to the lender each month, which covers the interest due for that month on the outstanding loan, plus a repayment of part of the capital. The flat amount is calculated so that the whole of the loan has been repaid by the end of the mortgage term.
- Interest-only mortgage – where the payments to the lender cover the interest only. No capital is repaid, so that the full amount of the loan is still outstanding at the end of the mortgage term. For example, if the amount of the loan is £90,000, and the interest rate (charged monthly) is 5.6% per year, the monthly interest payment will be {(90000*5.6%)/12}=£420.
- Endowment mortgage – an interest-only mortgage where the capital is planned to be repaid from the maturity value of one or more endowment policies at the end of the mortgage term.
- Investment backed mortgage – an interest-only mortgage where the capital is planned to be repaid from the proceeds of an Individual Savings Account (ISA) or other investment plan at the end of the mortgage term. Sometimes these are referred to as ISA mortgages.
- Pension mortgage – where money from a personal pension scheme is used to repay an interest-only mortgage on retirement.

=== Types of interest rate ===
- Variable rate – the rate varies at the discretion of the lender.
- Standard variable rate – the default variable rate the lender offers to mortgage borrowers with a standard residential mortgage.
- Tracker rate – a variable rate that is based on a published interest rate (typically LIBOR), plus a fixed interest rate margin. For instance LIBOR + 1.5%, so if LIBOR was 4% per year, the interest rate charged to the borrower would be 5.5% per year.
- Fixed rate – the interest rate remains fixed for a set period, typically for 2, 3, 4, 5 or 10 years; after which the arrangement reverts to a variable rate. Longer term fixed rates (over 5 years), if available, tend to be more expensive and/or have more onerous early repayment charges, and are therefore less popular than shorter term fixed rates. The high early repayment charges are necessary to protect the lender against a fall in market interest rates.
- Discount rate – where the interest rate charged is lower (e.g. 2% per year lower) for a short fixed period (typically 1 to 5 years), after which the full rate is charged. Sometimes the rate is stepped (e.g. 3% in year 1, 2% in year 2, 1% in year 3).
- Capped rate – a variable interest rate, but there is also a guarantee that the rate will not rise above a stated maximum. In order to provide this, the lender would probably need to purchase a derivative contract to protect itself against market interest rates rising above the cap, and would need to pass the cost of this on to the borrower. Sometimes there is also a collar, i.e. a stated minimum rate as well as a maximum. Capped rates are often offered over periods similar to fixed rates, e.g. 2, 3, 4 or 5 years.

=== Other ways to categorise mortgages ===
- Buy to let mortgage – a form of commercial mortgage used to purchase residential real estate with the intention of letting it to paying tenants.
- Right to buy mortgage – a mortgage arranged in connection with the "right to buy your home" legislation for council or housing association tenants.
- Let to buy – a form of transaction whereby homeowners rent out their current main residence, either by obtaining consent from their current mortgage lender or remortgaging to a buy to let loan, in order to purchase another home.
- Flexible mortgage – a mortgage that allows additional capital payments without penalty and often allows payment holidays or underpayments.
- Adverse credit mortgage – mortgages aimed at borrowers with credit problems, e.g. county court judgements.
- Self-certified mortgage – a mortgage where the lender does not seek proof of income to demonstrate affordability, but instead relies on a statement of earnings as "certified" by the borrower(s). Self-certified mortgages were banned by the Financial Conduct Authority (FCA) in April 2014.
- Non-status mortgage – a mortgage where the borrowing is not dependent on the income of the applicant and the applicant states that they can afford the repayments.
- Deferred interest mortgage – a mortgage that allows the borrower to make repayments that are lower than the amount of interest owed. The remainder is added to the principal, which is likely to increase to more than the original amount owed; the remaining interest payments will then be significantly higher. These mortgages were marketed during periods of high interest rates to young professionals whose salaries were expected to increase quickly.
- Offset mortgage – a mortgage where the borrower can reduce the interest charged by offsetting a credit balance against the mortgage debt.
- Foreign currency mortgage – where the debt is expressed in a foreign currency (typically one in which market interest rates are lower) in an attempt to reduce capital and interest payments. However this might well turn out to be more expensive for the borrower if the foreign currency appreciates against sterling.

== Fees ==
- Product fee – a fee payable by the borrower to obtain a (usually incentivised) product.
- Early repayment charge, redemption penalty or tie-in – the lender may incur many forms of up-front costs (for example property valuation costs, if not charged explicitly; or by offering a lower interest rate in the first few years of the mortgage; or – not least – remuneration of intermediaries or sales teams). It would seek to recoup these costs by charging higher interest rates over the remainder of the mortgage term. Therefore, they typically impose a penalty if the borrower repays the loan earlier than planned in order to ensure that at least some of these costs are recouped. These penalties used to be called a redemption penalty or tie-in; however, since the onset of Financial Services Authority regulation they are referred to as an early repayment charge.
- Valuation fee, which pays for a chartered surveyor to visit the property and ensure it is worth enough to cover the mortgage amount.
- Higher lending charge (HLC) – a fee levied by lenders in respect of mortgages exceeding a pre-defined loan-to-value (LTV) percentage threshold. Until the 1990s these were typically levied on all mortgages with an LTV percentage over 75%, but the market generally moved to a 90% threshold at that time. Subsequently, certain lenders have moved away from charging an explicit HLC, in favour of charging an increased interest rate on higher LTV mortgages.

== Other terms ==
- First time buyer
- Negative equity
- Introductory period – the period of time where there is a lower interest rate on a mortgage such as on a fixed rate mortgage.

== Statistical and industry jargon ==
- Arrangement fee – either a percentage of the loan advance or a set fee charged by the mortgage lender or mortgage brokers to provide and arrange a mortgage.
- Loan to Value (LTV) – the total loan size in relation to the value of the property.
- Mortgage gross lending – all new lending done in a given period, including remortgaging and new loans for house purchase.
- Mortgage balances outstanding – the total mortgage balances outstanding at a given point of time.
- Net mortgage lending – the total change in balances outstanding between two points in time, this can also be calculated by adding together the total gross lending in a period, less repayments, redemptions and loan losses in the same time period.
- Redemption – paying back a mortgage 'early' as opposed to paying back a mortgage following a set repayment plan, typically when remortgaging to another mortgage provider or by way of some other lump sum payment (e.g. when selling the property).
- Remortgaging – refinancing of a mortgage, usually understood to mean moving from one provider to another.

== See also ==
- Mortgage loan
- Remortgage
