= Write-off =

Recognition of a reduced or zero value

A write-off is a reduction of the recognized value of something. In accounting, this is a recognition of the reduced or zero value of an asset. In income tax statements, this is a reduction of taxable income, as a recognition of certain expenses required to produce the income.

== Income tax ==
In income tax calculation, a write-off is the itemized deduction of an item's value from a person's taxable income. Thus, if a person in the United States has a taxable income of $50,000 per year, a $100 telephone for business use would lower the taxable income to $49,900. If that person is in a 25% tax bracket, the tax due would be lowered by $25. Thus the net cost of the telephone is $75 instead of $100.

In order for American business owners to write off business expenses, the Internal Revenue Service states that purchases must be both ordinary and necessary. This means that deductible items must be usual and required for the business owner's field of work. For example, a chef may deduct the purchase of professional-grade culinary knives, since knives are crucial for that line of work, whereas a professional musician may not.

== Accounting ==
In business accounting, the term "write-off" is used to refer to an investment (such as a purchase of sellable goods) for which a return on the investment is now impossible or unlikely. The item's potential return is thus canceled and removed from ("written off") the business's balance sheet. Common write-offs in retail include spoiled and damaged goods. In commercial or industrial settings, a productive asset may be subject to write-off if it suffers failure or accident damage that is infeasible to repair, leaving the asset unusable for its intended purpose.

== Banking ==
Similarly, banks write off bad debt that is declared non collectable (such as a loan on a defunct business, or a credit card due that is in default), removing it from their balance sheets. A reduction in the value of an asset or earnings by the amount of an expense or loss. Companies are able to write off certain expenses that are required to run the business, or have been incurred in the operation of the business and detract from retained revenues.

== Negative write-offs ==
A negative write-off refers to the decision not to pay back an individual or organization that has overpaid on an account. Negative write-offs can sometimes be seen as fraudulent activity if those who overpay a claim or bill are not informed that they have overpaid and are not given any chance to reconcile their overpayment or be refunded.

Some institutions such as banks, hospitals, universities, and other large organizations regularly perform negative write-offs, especially when the amount is considered low (e.g., $5 at some institutions or up to $15 or more at others).

== Write-down ==
A write-down is an accounting treatment that recognizes the reduced value of an impaired asset. The value of an asset may change due to fundamental changes in technology or markets. One example is when one company purchases another and pays more than the net fair value of its assets and liabilities. The excess purchase price is recorded on the buying company's accounts as goodwill. If it becomes apparent that the purchased asset no longer has the value recorded in the goodwill account (i.e., if the asset cannot be resold at the same price), the value in the goodwill asset account is "written down". One example is when Rupert Murdoch's News Corp bought Wall Street Journal publisher Dow Jones at a 60% premium in 2007, which News Corp. later had to write down by $2.8 billion because of declining advertising revenues.

A write-down is sometimes considered synonymous with a write-off. The distinction is that while a write-off is generally completely removed from the balance sheet, a write-down leaves the asset with a lower value. As an example, one of the consequences of the 2007 subprime crisis for financial institutions was a revaluation under mark-to-market rules: "Washington Mutual will write down by $150 million the value of $17 billion in loans".

== Criticism ==
In recent years, companies like Warner Bros. Discovery have attracted criticism by audience and industry figures for cancelling almost-finished movies and removing TV shows from streaming services in order to claim tax write-offs. Some of these projects were "practically finished" or in the late stages of post-production, and many people remarked that many of the programs are effectively "lost media".

== See also ==
- Amortization
- Charge-off
- Depletion
- Depreciation
- Revaluation of fixed assets
