= Interest-only loan =

Type of loan

An interest-only loan is a loan in which the borrower pays only the interest for some or all of the term, with the principal balance unchanged during the interest-only period. At the end of the interest-only term the borrower must renegotiate another interest-only mortgage, pay the principal, or, if previously agreed, convert the loan to a principal-and-interest payment (amortizing) loan at the borrower's option.

== Economic effects ==
Interest-only securities are sometimes generated artificially from structured securities, particularly CMOs. A pool of securities (typically mortgages) is created, and divided into tranches; the cash received from the underlying debts are spread through the tranches according to predefined rules. An Interest-only (IO) security is one type of tranche that can be created, it is generally created in tandem with a principal-only (PO) tranche. These tranches will cater to two types of investors, depending on whether the investors are trying to increase their current yield (which they can get from an IO), or trying to reduce their exposure to prepayments of the loans (which they can get from a PO). The investment returns on IOs and POs depend heavily on mortgage prepayment rates and permit investors to benefit from different prepayment expectations.

Many U.S. markets saw home values increase by as much as four times in a five-year span in the early 2000s. Interest-only loans helped homeowners earn equity appreciation and thus be able to afford larger or more valuable homes during this time period. However, interest-only loans contributed greatly to creating the subsequent housing bubble where variable-rate borrowers could not afford the fully indexed rate or full principal-and-interest payments. Interest-only loans come with risks for borrowers and broader housing market stability when house prices drop as the outstanding mortgage can be larger than the value of the house.

== By country ==
=== United States ===
In the United States, a five- or ten-year interest-only period is typical. After this time, the principal balance is amortized for the remaining term. In other words, if a borrower had a thirty-year mortgage loan and the first ten years were interest only, at the end of the first ten years, the principal balance would be amortized for the remaining period of twenty years. The practical result is that the early payments (in the interest-only period) are substantially lower than the later payments. This gives the borrower more flexibility because the borrower is not forced to make payments towards principal. Indeed, it also enables a borrower who expects to increase his salary substantially over the course of the loan to borrow more than the borrower would have otherwise been able to afford, or investors to generate cashflow when they might not otherwise be able to. During the interest-only years of the mortgage, the loan balance will not decrease unless the borrower makes additional payments towards principal. Under a conventional amortizing mortgage, the portion of a payment that applies to principal is significantly smaller than the portion that applies to interest in the early years (the same period of time that would be interest-only).

Interest-only loans represent a somewhat higher risk for lenders, and therefore are often subject to a higher interest rate. Combined with little or no down payment, the adjustable rate (ARM) variety of interest-only mortgages are sometimes indicative of a buyer taking on too much risk—especially when that buyer is unlikely to qualify under more conservative loan structures. Because a homeowner does not build any equity in an interest-only loan he may be adversely affected by prevailing market conditions at the time the borrower is ready to either sell the house or refinance. The borrower may find themselves unable to afford the higher regularly amortized payments at the end of the interest-only period, unable to refinance due to lack of equity, and unable to sell if demand for housing has weakened.

Due to the speculative aspects of relying on home appreciation which may or may not happen, many financial experts such as Suze Orman advise against interest-only loans for which a borrower would not otherwise qualify. The types of interest-only loans that rely on home appreciation would be negative amortization loans, which most financial institutions discontinued in mid-2008.

A study published by the Federal Reserve Bank of Chicago before the 2008 financial crash claimed that most Americans could benefit from funding tax-deferred accounts rather than paying down mortgage balances. Homeowners sometimes use interest-only loans to free up monthly cash to fund retirement accounts. 3.4 million households don't contribute at all to their retirement but do accelerate the paying down of their mortgages. "Those households are losing from 11 to 17 cents for each dollar they put into a faster mortgage payoff", per a Chicago Federal Reserve study reiterated in the Chicago Tribune.

=== United Kingdom ===
Interest-only loans are popular ways of borrowing money to buy an asset that is unlikely to depreciate much and which can then be sold at the end of the loan to repay the capital. For example, second homes, or properties bought for letting to others. In the United Kingdom in the 1980s and 1990s a popular way to buy a house was to combine an interest-only loan with an endowment policy, the combination being known as an endowment mortgage. Homeowners were told that the endowment policy would cover the mortgage and provide a lump sum in addition. Many of these endowment policies were poorly managed and failed to deliver the promised amounts, some of which did not even cover the cost of the mortgage. This mis-selling, combined with the poor stock market performance of the late 1990s, has resulted in endowment mortgages becoming unpopular.

=== India ===
After the entry of private banks into the Indian banking sector, which was earlier dominated by nationalized banks, interest-only loans have been introduced. These loans are given provided that the borrower hands over a security (like gold ornaments) or the documents of the same (house papers) to the bank. Gold loans are the most common interest-only loans in India.

=== Singapore ===
In Singapore, interest-only mortgages had been disallowed since 14 September 2009. The reason for this was that this type of mortgage encouraged property speculations. Buyers will buy a private house while it is still under construction, and pay only the interest of the mortgage until the property is completed. Due to the lower monthly repayment (interest only) during the construction phase, some investors will acquire the house with the intention of selling it at a profit before the construction is then completed.

== See also ==
- Adjustable-rate mortgage
- Financial literacy
- Fixed-rate mortgage
- Mortgage loan
- Endowment policy
- UK mortgage terminology
- Balloon payment mortgage
- United States housing bubble
