= CapBridge =

Online investment platform

- Industry: Fintech
- Founded: 2015; 11 years ago
- Founder: Johnson Chen
- Headquarters: Singapore
- Area served: Asia-Pacific
- Key people: Johnson Chen CEO
- Website: capbridge.sg

CapBridge is an online investment platform, headquartered in Singapore. It was founded in 2015 and backed by Singapore Exchange. CapBridge was approved by the Monetary Authority of Singapore (MAS), Government of Singapore to operate both a primary capital raising platform utilizing a Capital Markets Securities License, and a private securities exchange - 1exchange with a Recognized Market Operator license.

== History ==
The company was founded in 2015 by Johnson Chen. It raised funding of S$4 million (US$2.9 million) from VC investor Tim Draper in October 2017. In May 2018, the company secured $5 million in Series A funding in an over-subscribed round.

In November 2018, the company received license from the Monetary Authority of Singapore to operate a securities exchange, 1exchange, as a recognised market operator. Singapore Exchange (SGX) has its investment in CapBridge through its subsidiary Asian Gateway Investments.

In February 2019, the company launched a product called Preferred Access. It allows investors to access multiple private equities or venture capital investments for a minimum amount of SGD $5,000. CapBridge also has a Capital Market Services license from the Monetary Authority of Singapore.
