= Eugene R. Black Sr. =

American banker and corporate executive (1898–1992)

Gene Black
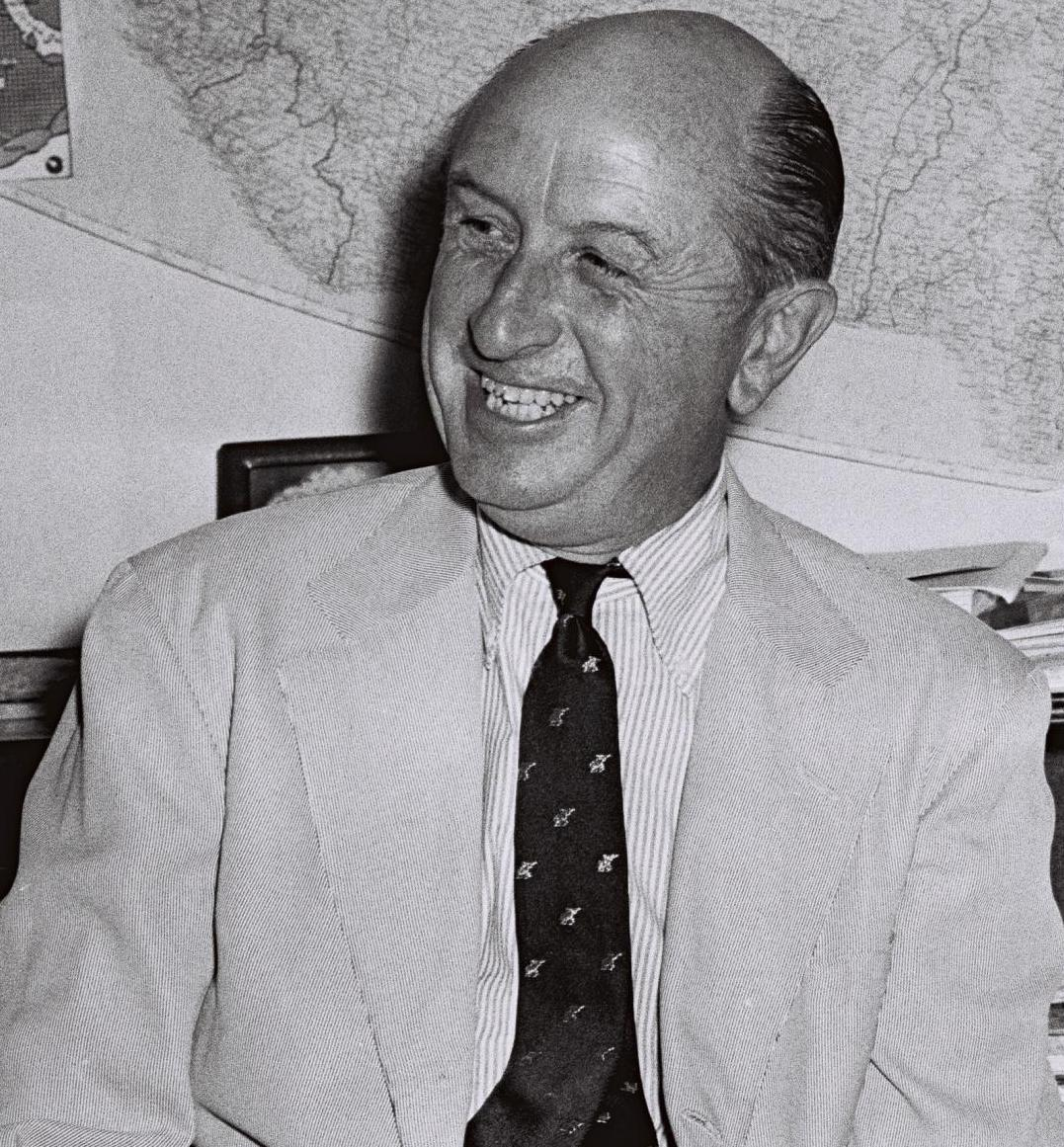

3rd President of the World Bank Group
- In office July 1, 1949 – January 1, 1963
- Preceded by: John McCloy
- Succeeded by: George Woods

Personal details
- Born: Eugene Robert Black; May 1, 1898 Atlanta, Georgia, U.S.
- Died: February 20, 1992 (aged 93) Southampton, New York, U.S.
- Parent: Eugene R. Black (father)
- Education: University of Georgia (BA)

Eugene Robert Black Sr. (May 1, 1898 – February 20, 1992) was an American investment banker who was the third president of the World Bank Group, serving from 1949 to 1962.

He was the eldest son of Eugene R. Black, who served as the sixth chairman of the Federal Reserve from 1933 to 1934. The first Eugene Robert Black did not use the "Sr." suffix, so his eldest son became Sr.

== Early life, education, and military service ==
Black was born in Atlanta, Georgia, in 1898.

He was the eldest son of Eugene R. Black, who served as the sixth chairman of the Federal Reserve from 1933 to 1934, during the height of the Great Depression. The first Eugene Robert Black did not use the "Sr." suffix, so his eldest son became Sr. and his grandson (the third in line) became Eugene Robert Black Jr.

Black attended the University of Georgia, graduating in 1917 with a BA in Latin.

Upon graduating from university in 1917, he enlisted in the United States Navy to fight in World War I; he was assigned to convoy duty in the North Atlantic.

== Career ==
=== Investment banking ===
Upon leaving the Navy after the war, Black joined the New York investment firm of Harris, Forbes & Co. He worked as a traveling salesperson for the firm, selling bonds and meeting with bankers and investors. He opened the firm's first southern office, in Atlanta, and later became a partner in the firm, and was known as a bond expert.

In 1933, he was hired by Chase National Bank, which had at one point owned Harris Forbes, as a second vice president, and moved back to New York. In 1937 he was promoted to senior vice president and was responsible Chase National's large investment portfolio.

=== World Bank ===
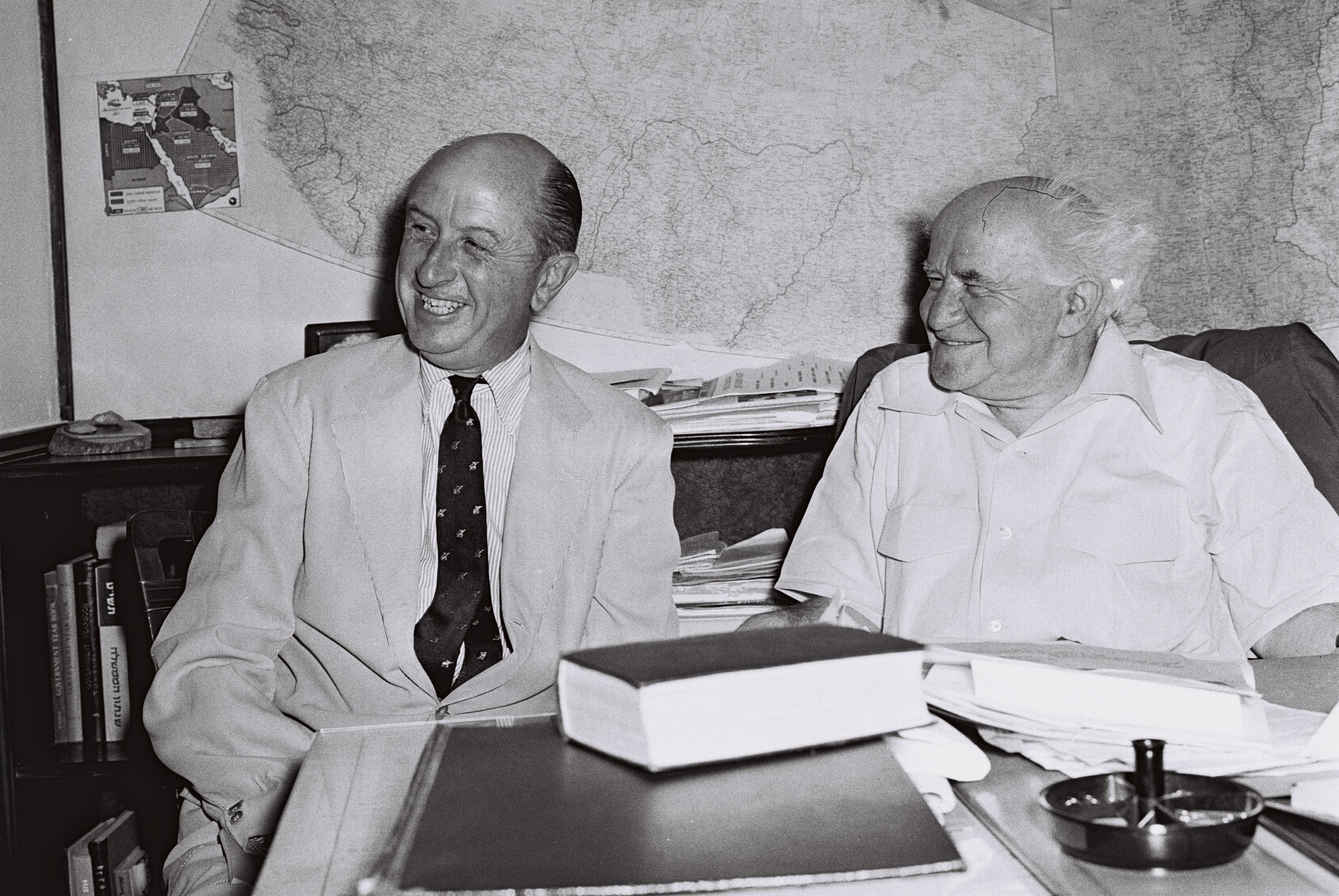
Black visiting David Ben-Gurion in Jerusalem in 1960

In 1944, the World Bank was established by the Bretton Woods Conference, mainly to provide loans for the rebuilding of postwar Europe. It began operating in 1946. In 1947 John J. McCloy accepted the presidency of the bank, but only under the proviso that Black would be appointed its executive director. Chase National Bank gave Black a two-year leave of absence.

When McCloy resigned in 1949, Black, against his will, was nominated to replace him and became the third president of the bank, beginning July 1, 1949.

Prior to his tenure at the bank, it had made only 10 loans, mainly to war-torn countries in Western Europe.

Some of Black's main accomplishments at the bank during his 15.5-year presidency were publicizing and marketing the bank, lobbying state legislators and Congress to pass legislation so that the bank's bonds could be sold nationwide, improving the bank's creditworthiness and credit rating, getting the bank's bonds sold internationally, and soliciting non-U.S. banking-institution investors.

Black had a reputation as a master marketer of bonds; he traveled internationally to attract investors, and ultimately amassed $21 billion in capital for the bank.

=== Additional posts ===
From 1962 to 1968, Black was chairman of the Brookings Institution.

In 1963, the United States was considering pursuing a program to create a supersonic transport (SST) to rival the British and French Concorde. President Kennedy commissioned an outside review of the feasibility of a federally funded SST program. Black and Stanley Osborne, chairman of Olin Mathieson Chemical Corporation, led the commission. The review was completed in December 1963 and given to President Lyndon B. Johnson. The report recommended not pursuing a race against the Concorde and instead focusing the effort initially on building a test aircraft for research.

President Johnson selected Black in 1966 to be Special Adviser to the President on Southeast Asian Social and Economic Development. In this position, Black was charged with organizing and establishing the Asian Development Bank. This was a task that Black was initially quite hesitant to undertake, but Johnson would not take no for an answer. To President Johnson, the creation of the ADB was an important step in securing Asian support for, or at least acquiescence to, the War in Vietnam.

Black also served on a number of boards for corporations and foundations. The University of Georgia Foundation named a fellowship in honor of him and his achievements. Princeton University awarded him an honorary Doctor of Laws degree in 1960. Black was Chair of the Peabody Awards Board of Jurors from 1967 to 1977.

== Personal life ==
Black's first wife, with whom he had a son and a daughter, was Elizabeth B. Black, who died in the early 1930s. His second wife was Susette Heath Black, with whom he had a son.

He retired in 1977 to his home in Southampton, New York.

He died at the age of 93 in February 1992 from kidney and heart ailments.

Diplomatic posts
Preceded by John McCloy	President of the World Bank Group; 1949–1963	Succeeded by George Woods
