= Mortgage interest relief at source =

United Kingdom government scheme

Mortgage interest relief at source, or MIRAS, was a housing tax relief scheme in the United Kingdom from 1983 to 2000, which was introduced as a way of reducing the amount of tax relief granted to mortgage borrowers.

== Function ==
As its name suggests, it allowed borrowers to make mortgage repayments that already included tax relief on interest, instead of the traditional method of reclaiming the tax from the Inland Revenue.

== History ==
Tax relief on interest had been available since income tax was introduced in the early 19th century. In 1969 the then Chancellor of the Exchequer, Roy Jenkins, ended this tax relief for all loans except for business purposes or for the purchase or improvement of a home. This meant that borrowers could no longer claim tax relief on, for example, the interest on bank loans or overdrafts. In 1974 a £25,000 limit on interest relief was set.

This system of providing interest relief was widely criticised for failing to support first time home buyers, as it provided greater benefits to borrowers on higher incomes, many of whom were upgrading to more expensive houses or buying second properties. In the mid-1970s the top rate of income tax was 83% on an income above £20,000 a year. Interest relief set against these high levels of tax meant that high-income borrowers could save large amounts of tax, while low-income borrowers who paid little or no income tax would not receive the same benefit. To address this, the Option Mortgage Scheme was set up, directly reducing mortgage interest payments rather than requiring the borrower to claim back tax relief from the Inland Revenue. The aim of the scheme was to provide “benefits roughly equal to those that are available to people with higher incomes.”

The MIRAS scheme, set up by chancellor Geoffrey Howe in 1983, expanded on the Option Mortgage Scheme, providing borrowers with mortgage interest tax relief at source, even if their income was too low for them to pay income tax. It allowed for mortgage interest relief for loans of up to £30,000 taken out for the purchase or improvement of the main residence of the borrower. Like the Option Mortgage Scheme, the borrower did not have to claim the tax relief from the Inland Revenue; rather the lender reduced the mortgage payments for the borrower and then reclaimed the tax relief from the Inland Revenue.

Unmarried couples with joint mortgages could pool their allowances to £60,000, a provision known as Multiple Mortgage Tax Relief or double MIRAS. This remained in place until the 1988 Budget, when Nigel Lawson ended the option to pool allowances from August 1988. The delayed implementation of the end of double MIRAS fuelled a sharp increase in house prices as buyers rushed to purchase properties before the August deadline.

== Reduction and abolition ==
In 1991, Normal Lamont restricted the relief to the basic rate of tax (then 25%), reducing the value of the subsidy to higher rate taxpayers. In 1994 the rate of relief was reduced to 20%, with further reductions to 15% in 1995 by Kenneth Clarke and to 10% in 1998 by Gordon Brown. MIRAS was completely abolished in April 2000 by Gordon Brown, who argued it had become a middle class perk.

== Republic of Ireland ==
There was a similar scheme in the Republic of Ireland, offering tax relief at source for qualifying mortgages taken out between 2004 and 2012.

== See also ==
- UK mortgage terminology
