= George David Woods =

American banker (1901–1982)

George Woods

President of the World Bank Group
- In office January 1, 1963 – March 31, 1968
- Preceded by: Gene Black
- Succeeded by: Robert McNamara

Personal details
- Born: July 27, 1901 Boston, Massachusetts, U.S.
- Died: August 20, 1982 (aged 81) Lisbon, Portugal, New York, U.S.

George David Woods (July 27, 1901 – August 20, 1982) was an American investment banker and financier. He served as the fourth President of the World Bank, from January 1963 until March 1968. Prior to that he had a 46-year career in investment banking, rising to chairman of First Boston Corporation.

== Early life and education ==
Woods was born in Boston, Massachusetts in 1901. He grew up Brooklyn, New York City, where his father, who died when Woods was three, had moved the family to find shipyard work.

He attended high school at Commercial High School in Brooklyn.

== Career ==
=== Investment banking ===
After graduating from high school, at the age of 17 Woods was employed on Wall Street as an office boy at the investment firm Harris, Forbes & Co. At the company's urging, he attended night school in banking theory and finance, and in the firm's underwriting department he drafted prospectuses, did statistical work, and drew up contracts. in 1927, at the age of 26, he was promoted to a vice president position and given major projects. In 1930 Harris, Forbes & Co. was acquired by Chase Bank, and Woods was made vice president of the new firm.

In 1933, the firm was dissolved after the passage of the Glass–Steagall Act, and Chase transferred what remained of its securities business to the Bank of Boston's newly formed First Boston Corporation. Woods was included in the transfer and became vice president and a member of the board of First Boston Corporation.

First Boston became one of the largest investment banking firms in the United States, and Woods played a major role in that expansion. In 1947 he became one of two executive vice presidents, and in 1948 became chairman of the executive committee. In 1951 Woods became chairman of the board.

=== World Bank ===
Woods was first called to the World Bank by Eugene Black, the World Bank's president from 1949 to 1962, who was an old associate and friend from Harris, Forbes. While at the World Bank, Black had asked him to help out on special assignments for the bank. Woods had thereby become familiar with the workings of the World Bank. In the summer of 1962, Black asked Woods to meet with the Kennedy Administration, which subsequently nominated him for president of the World Bank, and he accepted. He took office January 1, 1963.

Whereas the first three World Bank presidents had focused on loans for reconstruction, Woods shifted the bank towards a primary focus on less developed countries. By the end of Woods's tenure, the bank was engaged in a far broader range of developmental activities than at its beginning.

Woods led a major expansion in the World Bank's lending for agriculture and for agrarian reform. Woods also expanded lending for higher education, but only for technical and vocational schools. Additional lending went to water supply, and "technical assistance". The various areas of developmental loans were considered "riskier" investments than reconstruction loans, and therefore justified the significant excess profits the World Bank had been making by the early 1960s.

The main beneficiaries of the new developmental lending were India and Pakistan, rather than the newly emerging African nations. From 1964 to the end of his tenure, Woods rebuffed most new requests from the newly emerging African nations.

In 1966, despite the General Assembly of the United Nations passing resolutions condemning the apartheid regime in South Africa and the continuing colonial subjugation of Angola and Mozambique by Portugal as violations of the U.N. charter, and despite a personal plea from U.N. Secretary General U Thant to Woods, the World Bank proceeded with a $10 million loan to Portugal and a $20 million loan to South Africa.

Woods increased the number, power, and influence of economists at the bank. In 1964 he hired Irving S. Friedman as the newly created position of economic advisor to the president. Friedman hired nearly 200 economists, thus increasing the overall World Bank staff by 25 percent. Friedman worked to change World Bank preferences from infrastructure projects toward policy-based economic development. The economists were instrumental in advancing American interests.

Woods strongly supported increased foreign private investment in developing countries. In his first address to the World Bank's board, he pledged to explore “all possible ways in which the Bank can help to widen and deepen the flow of private capital to the developing countries”. He added that he was convinced that countries which accept this "will achieve their development objectives more rapidly than those who do not", and "that means, to mince no words about it, giving foreign investors a fair opportunity to make attractive profits".

== Additional posts ==
Woods was a director of The New York Times Company. He was also one of the three trustees of the Ochs Trust, which holds a controlling interest in The New York Times Company and was established by Adolph S. Ochs, the publisher of The New York Times from 1896 until his death in 1935.

From 1961 to 1967, Woods was a trustee of the Rockefeller Foundation. He was a member of the Commission on Population Growth and the American Future.

In addition, long after he had turned over the leadership of the First Boston Corporation of New York, Woods maintained an office in New York and was sought out by executives around the world for consultation.

He served as a director of numerous companies during his career.

Woods was a director of the Lincoln Center for the Performing Arts, and chairman of the Repertory Theater of Lincoln Center.

For several years he was treasurer and a director of the Ringling Brothers and Barnum & Bailey Circus, and helped his friend John Ringling North reorganize the circus.

== Honors ==
- Malaysia : Honorary Grand Commander of the Order of Loyalty to the Crown of Malaysia (1973)

== Personal life ==
Woods married Louise Taraldson in 1935. They had no children. Louise was a civic leader, and became a trustee of the Institute of International Education.

Woods never moved to Washington DC, not even during his tenure as World Bank president. The couple lived in Manhattan, and had a second home in Lisbon.

Woods was close to Nelson A. Rockefeller, and for a time had a home at the Rockefeller estate at Pocantico Hills, New York.

Woods died in Lisbon in 1982 at the age of 81. His wife died in Manhattan in 1986 at the age of 78.

Diplomatic posts
Preceded by Gene Black	President of the World Bank Group; 1963–1968	Succeeded by Robert McNamara
