= With-profits policy =

Type of life insurance policy

A with-profits policy (Commonwealth) or participating policy (U.S.) is an insurance contract that participates in the profits of a life insurance company. The company is often a mutual life insurance company, or had been one when it began its with-profits product line. Similar arrangements are found in other countries such as those in continental Europe.

With-profits policies evolved over many years. Originally they developed as a means of distributing unplanned surplus, arising e.g. from lower than anticipated death rates. More recently they have been used to provide flexibility to pursue a more adventurous investment policy to aim to achieve long-term capital growth. They have been accepted as a form of long-term collective investment whereby the investor chooses the insurance company based on factors such as financial strength, historic returns and the terms of the contracts offered.

The premiums paid by with-profits and non-profit policyholders are pooled within the insurance company's life fund (Commonwealth) or general account (USA). The company uses the pooled assets to pay out claims. A large part of the life fund is invested in equities, bonds, and property to aim to achieve a high overall return.

The insurance company aims to distribute part of its profit to the with-profits policy holders in the form of a bonus (Commonwealth) or dividend (USA) attached to their policy (see the bonus section). The bonus rate is decided after considering a variety of factors such as the return on the underlying assets, the level of bonuses declared in previous years and other actuarial assumptions (especially future liabilities and anticipated investment returns), as well as marketing considerations.

== Types of policies ==
There are two main categories of with-profits policies:

- Single premium contracts – insurance bonds (with-profit bonds), single premium endowments, single premium pension policies.
- Regular premium contracts in which premium payments are usually made monthly – endowment policies, pension policies.

=== Conventional and unitised ===
Conventional with-profits contracts have a basic sum assured to which bonuses are added. The basic sum assured is the minimum amount of life assurance payable on death; for endowment contracts it is also the minimum lump sum payable at maturity.

The basic sum assured attracts reversionary bonuses which are used to distribute profits to the policy. Once a reversionary bonus is added it cannot be removed from the policy. The required premiums must have been maintained to receive payment of the basic sum assured and bonuses. If the premiums have not been maintained, a reduced amount (or in some cases none) will be paid. For insurance bonds, the basic sum assured plus bonuses represents the plan value. When the policy matures, a final bonus may be added to reflect the policy's share of profits which have not yet been distributed.

Unitised with-profits policies work in a similar way except that the policy value is expressed as a number of units. Various models have been adopted by different insurers, but typically either:

1. the fund value is represented by the bid value of units, which may increase with time, or
2. the number of units increases each year to represent the increase in value and the unit price remains fixed.

Endowments still retain a basic sum assured (in most cases) although this may be notional rather than a structural part of the policy.

Unitised with-profits policies were introduced as a response to competition from unit-linked life policies that became available in the 1970s. The unitised version was somewhat less opaque than the conventional version, with less surplus being held back, and also made possible switching between with-profits and unit-linked funds.

The conventional policies have an element of guarantee conferred by the contractual nature of their basic sum assured. This guaranteed element, which is not profit related, has caused issues for insurers in the realistic reporting regime (see below). Most policies issued today are unitised and often are held in ring-fenced sub-funds of the life fund rather than participating in the full profits of the life company.

== Smoothing ==
With-profits funds employ the concept of smoothing. That is, a proportion of the profits earned during good years is held back to aim to ensure that a reasonable return is paid during years of poor performance. This may result in a smoothed effect on the increase of the unit price, as opposed to fluctuations that would normally occur in the daily price for other stocks or shares. An important difference between this and the normal statistical sense of smoothing is that it has to be attempted without knowledge of future developments, which may cause the "smoothed" value to move further and further out of line with the "unsmoothed" value, necessitating a sharp correction at some point in the future.

== Types of bonus ==
A reversionary bonus is awarded during the term of the insurance contract, and guaranteed to be paid at maturity. It cannot be removed after declaration. The annual bonus may consist of two parts. The guaranteed bonus is an amount normally expressed as a monetary amount per £1,000 sum assured. It is set at the outset of the policy and usually cannot be varied. The rest of the annual bonus will depend on the investment return achieved by the fund subject to smoothing.

The terminal bonus is awarded and paid at the maturity and sometimes the surrender of the policy. Thus, it is unknown before the maturity of contract. It is sometimes referred to as the final bonus. The terminal bonus represents the member's entitlement to a proportion of the fund that has been held back for the purpose of smoothing. In certain circumstances a Market Value Adjustor may be applied to reduce the overall policy value to limit the payout to a reasonable multiple of the member's fair share.

The insurance company has some freedom to decide what mix of bonuses to pay. An insurance company may decide to pay low annual bonuses and a high terminal bonus. Such a policy will protect the insurance company from falls in the investment markets because annual bonuses cannot be taken away once given. However, this policy might be unattractive to investors because it does not contain many guarantees and offers a low rate of return (until the maturity of the policy).

Occasionally an insurer may decide to pay an exceptional bonus possibly due to restructuring of the company or exceptional investment returns. This is almost unheard of these days.

== Market Value Reduction (MVR) ==
A Market Value Reduction or Market Value Adjustor is a mechanism used by the insurance company to ensure that policy withdrawal payments are reasonable in relation to the policy's fair entitlement to the assets of the life fund. After a period of poor investment performance the value of the withdrawal is reduced to reflect the reduction in the underlying value of the assets of the life fund.

== Perceived risk and actual risk ==
For many years with-profits policies were seen as a safe alternative to deposit accounts for many investors (especially elderly investors). Years of steady reliable returns in combination with unscrupulous sales tactics from insurers fostered the impression that a 'low-risk' investor should invest in with-profits. This perceived low risk belied the reality of the underlying investment strategies of many insurers who used high equity exposure and high-risk financial instruments to achieve the returns.

In the middle of the bear market of the early 2000s the UK regulator (the Financial Services Authority) imposed a new regulatory regime for with-profit providers, in response to growing consumer complaints following the introduction of market value reductions. The realistic reporting regime had the combined effect of requiring the insurers to move more of their funds into lower-risk investments (corporate bonds, and gilts) to cover liabilities; and to lower projection rates in line with the new asset mix of the fund to more accurately predict future returns.

== Regulation ==
The policy value is either the present value of the basic sum assured plus the bonuses given, less future premiums (for conventional contracts) or the bid value of a unitised with-profits policy. This value is broadly equivalent to the value of the underlying assets. However, because of investment fluctuations, and also because of the expenses incurred when the policy is issued, this value may exceed the market value of the underlying assets.

Without appropriate regulation an insurance company might not have enough money to pay the value of its policies. This was the case with The Equitable Life Assurance Society in the UK when the costs of annuity guarantees determined by the courts as having been promised to some policyholders meant that the company was forced to cease the introduction of new business and nearly led to the collapse of the company.

The Financial Services Authority (FSA) in the UK altered regulation as a consequence of this and other management failures to ensure that an insurance company keeps enough free reserves to protect the company in the event of falls in the markets. The new valuation method requires, as an additional "pillar", a realistic valuation of the fund's assets and growth prospects. In addition each firm must now publish a document called the Principles and Practices of Financial Management (PPFM) for each with-profits fund with a breakdown of the assets and an explanation of the management processes for the fund. These documents, although very detailed, are largely incomprehensible for consumers and are thought to be of use only for independent financial advisers and other industry professionals, and also to act as a constraint on how the company distributes surplus. The realistic reporting method has been cited as a factor contributing to the demutualisation of Standard Life Assurance Company.

In the USA, insurance companies are regulated on a state-by-state basis. However, they must not only comply with the requirements of the state in which they are incorporated, but also with the regulations of each state in which they are licensed. The National Association of Insurance Commissioners (NAIC) provides suggested guidelines which each state is free to follow or not. For example, the Insurance Information Institute, "Life insurers are the object of the NAIC’s Interstate Insurance Product Regulation Compact, launched in 2002 as a way to develop uniform standards and a central clearinghouse to provide prompt review and regulatory approval for life insurance products."

== Reputation ==
For many years with-profit funds were very popular and large numbers of such policies were sold within the United Kingdom and in the United States.

Recently with-profit funds have had a large amount of negative press due to the introduction of MVRs. This has led people to question the opacity in setting bonus rates and the over-complexity of the product in general. Simple to understand products have been encouraged recently and the nature of the conventional with-profit fund does not fit with such simple policies. Alternatives such as a more fund-type product, CPPI or smoothed managed funds are yet to show a significant popularity amongst consumers.

Secondly the Equitable Life company sold a large number of policies with guarantees in the contract. After a series of court cases the nature of the guarantees for some policies was reinterpreted, becoming more onerous. As the company was required to meet these guarantees, the amount available to allot bonuses to its policyholders in general was drastically reduced, although the company had provided illustrations of projected benefits on the basis that these bonuses would be maintained. This resulted in a reduction in the value of many policies issued by the company. This reduction received considerable negative publicity and damaged the reputation of with-profit policies.

== See also ==
- Endowment policy
- Endowment mortgage
- Insurance bond
- Insurance company
