= President of the World Bank Group =

Head of the World Bank Group

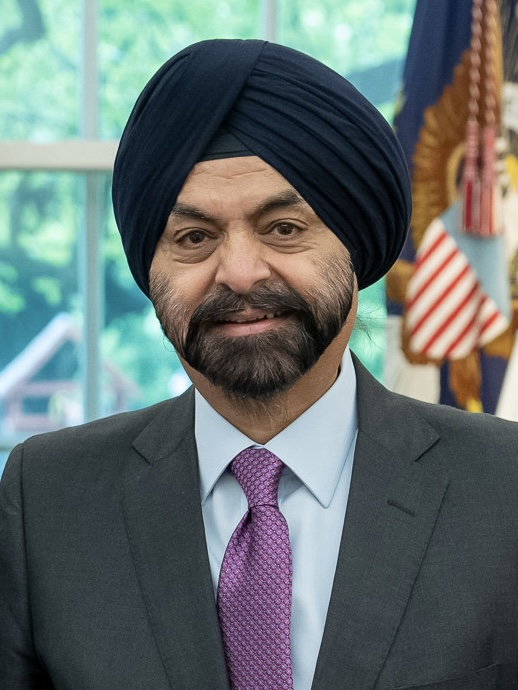
- Incumbent; Ajay Banga since June 2, 2023
- Term length: Five years, renewable
- Website: president.worldbankgroup.org

The president of the World Bank Group is the head of World Bank Group. The president is responsible for chairing the meetings of the boards of directors and for overall management of the World Bank Group.

The nominee is subject to confirmation by the Board of Executive Directors, to serve for a five-year, renewable term. Traditionally, the World Bank Group president has always been an American citizen nominated by the United States, the Bank's largest shareholder, and the IMF's managing director has been a European citizen. While most World Bank Group presidents have had economic experience, some have not.

The fourteenth and current World Bank Group president is Ajay Banga, who was selected on May 3 and began his term on June 2, 2023.

== List of World Bank Group presidents ==
Status

Denotes an acting president of the World Bank Group

#	Portrait	Name	Term	Nationality	Background	Notes
1		Eugene Meyer	June 18, 1946 – December 18, 1946	United States	Investor and publisher of The Washington Post; Chairman of the U.S. Federal Reserve	First World Bank Group president
2		John J. McCloy	March 17, 1947 – June 30, 1949	United States	U.S. Assistant Secretary of War during World War II	First World Bank Group president with military background
3		Eugene R. Black Sr.	July 1, 1949 – December 31, 1962	United States	Bank executive with Chase Manhattan Bank; Executive Director of the World Bank	
4		George Woods	January 1, 1963 – March 31, 1968	United States	Investment banker and bank executive with First Boston Corporation	
5		Robert McNamara	April 1, 1968 – June 30, 1981	United States	Business executive with Ford Motor Company; U.S. Secretary of Defense in both the John F. Kennedy administration and Lyndon B. Johnson administration	
6		Alden W. Clausen	July 1, 1981 – June 30, 1986	United States	President and CEO with Bank of America	
7		Barber Conable	July 1, 1986 – August 31, 1991	United States	U.S. Representative from New York	First World Bank Group president without business background
8		Lewis T. Preston	September 1, 1991 – May 4, 1995	United States	Bank executive with J.P. Morgan & Co.	First Word Bank Group president to die in office Preston had been on medical leave from his position since February 1995 and had intended to formally retire from the Bank at the end of May of the same year. Ernest Stern was appointed interim World Bank Group president in his absence.
–		Ernest Stern; Acting	February 1, 1995 – May 31, 1995	United States	Managing Director of the World Bank; Assistant Administrator of the U.S. Agency for International Development (USAID)	First interim World Bank Group president born outside United States; First World Bank Group president born in Europe; First World Bank Group president from Germany
9		James Wolfensohn	June 1, 1995 – May 31, 2005	United States (Note: Prior to taking office, Wolfensohn renounced his Australian citizenship to become naturalized as an American citizen since, by tradition, the head of the World Bank is always an American. He regained Australian citizenship after leaving office.)	Corporate lawyer and investment banker	First permanent World Bank Group president born outside United States; First World Bank Group president born in Oceania; First World Bank Group president from Australia
10		Paul Wolfowitz	June 1, 2005 – June 30, 2007	United States	U.S. Deputy Secretary of Defense in the George W. Bush administration	
11		Robert Zoellick	July 1, 2007 – June 30, 2012	United States	Bank executive with Goldman Sachs; U.S. Deputy Secretary of State and U.S. Trade Representative in the George W. Bush administration	
12		Jim Yong Kim	July 1, 2012 – February 1, 2019	United States	Physician, anthropologist and co-founder of Partners in Health; President of Dartmouth College	First person of color to serve as World Bank Group president First World Bank Group president born in Asia; First World Bank Group president from South Korea
–		Kristalina Georgieva; Acting	February 1, 2019 – April 8, 2019	Bulgaria	CEO of the World Bank; Vice-President of the European Commission and European Commissioner for Budget and Human Resources in the Juncker Commission, European Commissioner for International Cooperation, Humanitarian Aid and Crisis Response in the Barroso Commission	First woman to serve as interim World Bank Group president First World Bank Group president from European Union, from former Eastern Bloc, and from Bulgaria
13		David Malpass	April 9, 2019–June 1, 2023	United States	Chief Economist at Bear Stearns; U.S. Under Secretary of the Treasury for International Affairs in the Donald Trump administration	
14		Ajay Banga	June 2, 2023–present	United States	Vice Chairman at General Atlantic; President and CEO of Mastercard	First World Bank Group president born in South Asia; First World Bank Group president from India
