= Insurance bond =

Single premium life assurance policy for the purposes of investment

An insurance bond (or investment bond) is a single premium life assurance policy for the purposes of investment. Due to tax laws they are a common form of investment in the UK and some offshore centres to avoid tax.

Traditionally insurance bonds were with-profits policies and were often called with-profit(s) bonds. Since the introduction of unitised insurance funds they have often been marketed as unit-linked bonds or investment bonds.

== History ==
Traditionally investment bonds only invested in the with-profit fund of the insurance company. However, since the late 1970s the insurers have tried to compete directly with the unit trust market in offering a wide choice of unit-linked investment funds. Geographic and themed funds for almost every sector are available.

One innovation from the insurers is the distribution fund introduced by Sun Life in 1979. A distribution fund is designed to provide a regular rising income for investors. This is achieved by carefully balancing income generating assets such as corporate bonds and/or property with equities. The equity element provides some growth and the other assets the income. Since 2000 distribution bonds have been popular and have provided another option to with-profit bonds as the low risk investment of choice in the UK.

== Tax impact ==
The decision of which 'wrapper' to place funds within (i.e. onshore bond, offshore bond or collective) can be complex and is based upon the tax position of the investor, the treatment of each tax wrapper, the likely growth and investment term.

Insurance bonds can be useful in the United Kingdom for minimizing tax as they do not incur the 50% Capital Gains Tax (CGT) reduction on assets held for 12 months or more.

The advantages of Insurance Bonds for tax planning scenarios include the tax deferred status, the ability to write the investment in trust and reduce the inheritance tax liability on an estate, and exclusive access to expensive investment links like guaranteed or protected profits funds. Bonds can provide income or growth and when income is required there are bonds that can offer a set minimum guaranteed income for life of the plan holder.

== Offshore Insurance Bonds ==
While the use of offshore insurance bonds in the UK allows tax deferral and can be a useful financial planning tool, this is not always the case when sold to non-UK tax residents. Concerns have been raised about the suitability and even legality of their sale in some EU countries, where there are likely no specific tax advantages.

There are exceptions and some countries allow investment into tax compliant offshore insurance bonds where tax reporting is automatic to the local tax authorities. Examples include Spanish compliant bonds and Life Assurance Vie in France

== See also ==
- Unit trusts
- Collective investment scheme
- Life assurance
- Investment
- With-profits policies
- Unitised insurance funds
