= John J. McCloy =

American lawyer and banker (1895–1989)

Jack McCloy
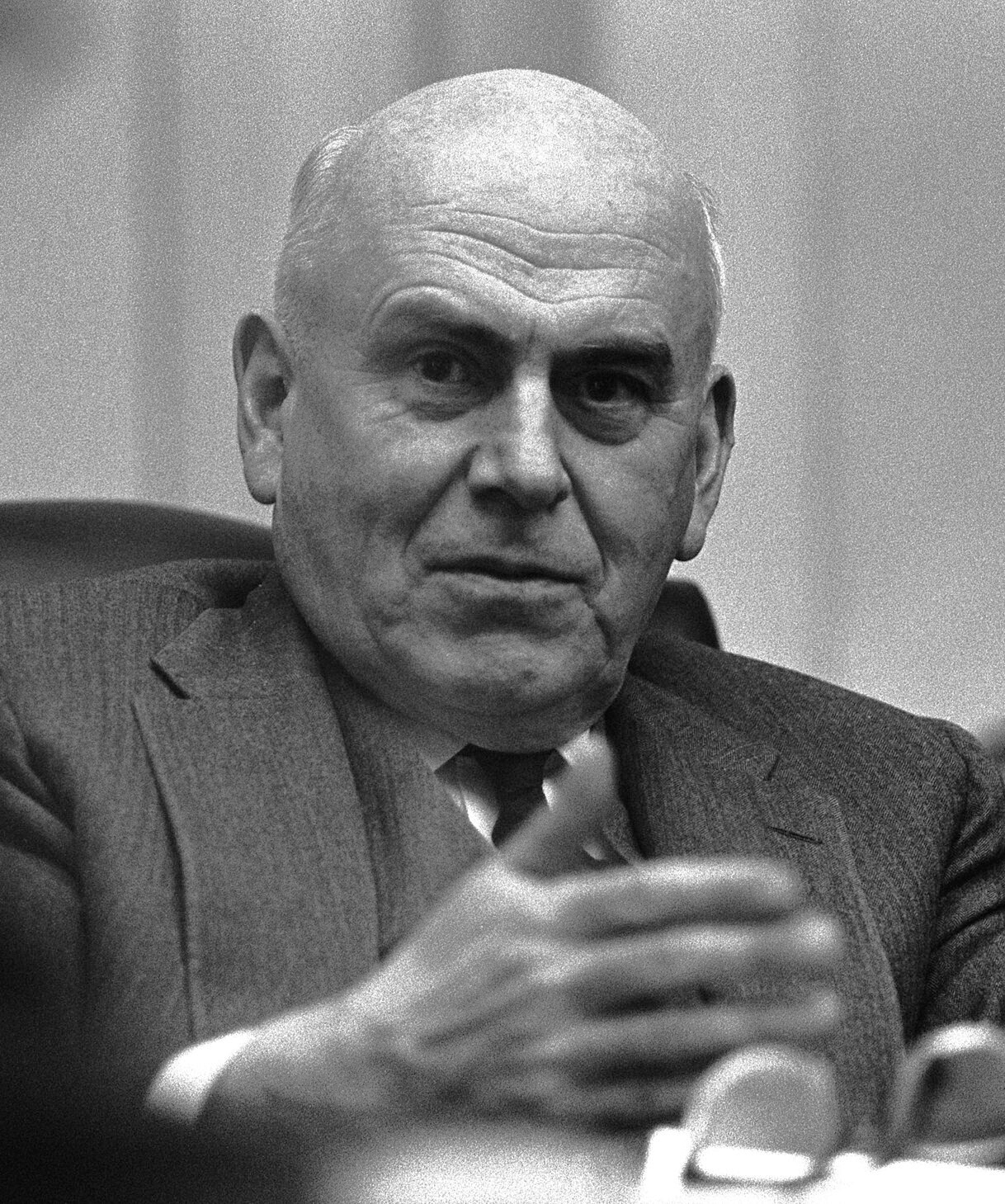
- McCloy in 1966

Director of the Disarmament Administration
- In office January 27, 1961 – October 6, 1961
- President: John F. Kennedy
- Preceded by: Harold Stassen (Special Assistant to the President for Disarmament, 1958)
- Succeeded by: William Foster (Director of the Arms Control and Disarmament Agency)

Chair of the Council on Foreign Relations
- In office 1953–1970
- Preceded by: Russell Leffingwell
- Succeeded by: David Rockefeller

American High Commissioner for Occupied Germany
- In office September 21, 1949 – August 1, 1952
- President: Harry Truman
- Preceded by: Position established
- Succeeded by: Walter J. Donnelly

2nd President of the World Bank Group
- In office March 17, 1947 – June 30, 1949
- Preceded by: Eugene Meyer
- Succeeded by: Gene Black

United States Assistant Secretary of War
- In office April 22, 1941 – November 24, 1945
- President: Franklin D. Roosevelt; Harry S. Truman
- Preceded by: Robert P. Patterson
- Succeeded by: Howard C. Petersen

Personal details
- Born: John Snader McCloy; March 31, 1895 Philadelphia, Pennsylvania, U.S.
- Died: March 11, 1989 (aged 93) Cos Cob, Connecticut, U.S.
- Party: Republican
- Spouse: Ellen Zinsser (m. 1930; died 1986)
- Children: 2
- Education: Amherst College (BA); Harvard University (LLB)
- Awards: Presidential Medal of Freedom with distinction (1963)

John Jay McCloy (March 31, 1895 – March 11, 1989) was an American lawyer, diplomat, and banker. He served as Assistant Secretary of War during World War II under Henry Stimson. In this capacity he dealt with German sabotage and political tensions in the North Africa Campaign. He was the prime mover of Japanese internment, as well as a high-ranking federal bureaucrat who opposed the atomic bombings of Hiroshima and Nagasaki.

After the war, he served as the president of the World Bank, U.S. High Commissioner for Germany, chairman of Chase Manhattan Bank, chairman of the Council on Foreign Relations, a member of the Warren Commission, and a prominent adviser to all presidents from Franklin D. Roosevelt to Ronald Reagan. McCloy was one of a group of important foreign policy advisers whose activities are detailed in the 1986 book The Wise Men, by Walter Isaacson and Evan Thomas, who describe McCloy as "the most influential private citizen in the United States".

== Early life ==
John McCloy was born in Philadelphia, Pennsylvania, the son of John J. McCloy (1862–1901) and Anna (née Snader) McCloy (1866–1959). His father was an insurance man who died when McCloy was five. His mother was a hairdresser in Philadelphia, with many high-society clients. McCloy's family was poor; he would later often say he grew up on the "wrong side of the tracks," and describe himself as being outside the establishment circles in which he would later move. His original name was "John Snader McCloy". It was later changed to "John Jay McCloy", probably to sound more aristocratic.

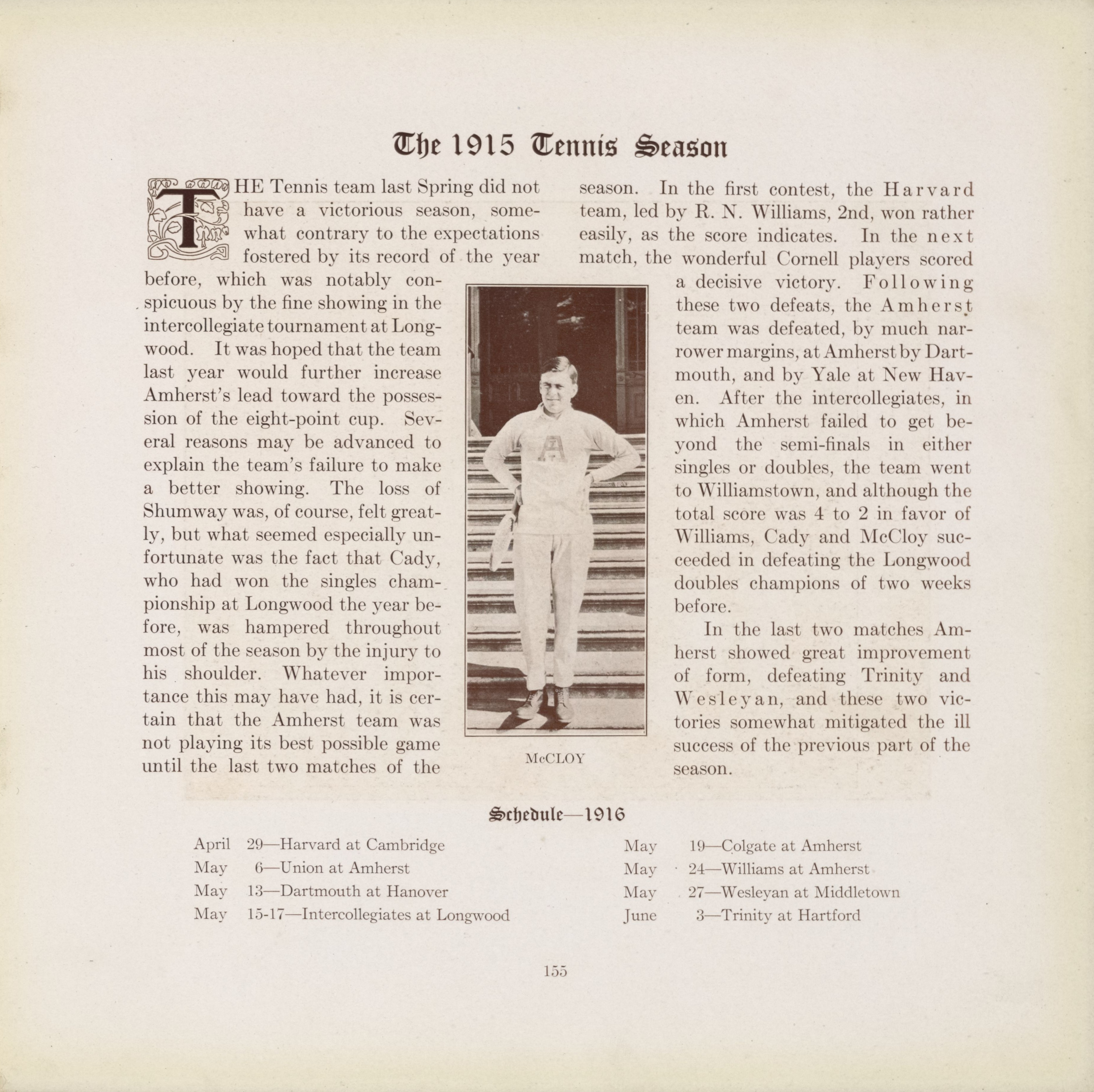
McCloy in the Amherst College yearbook, 1917

McCloy was educated at the Peddie School in New Jersey, and Amherst College from which he graduated in 1916. He was an above-average student who excelled at tennis and moved smoothly among the sons of the nation's elite. McCloy was a brother of Beta Theta Pi fraternity at Amherst. In 1930, McCloy married Ellen Zinsser, a native of Hastings-on-Hudson, New York and a 1918 graduate of Smith College. She was active in volunteer and civic organizations, such as volunteer nursing programs and served on the board of the New York chapter of the Girls Clubs of America, the Bellevue Hospital nursing school, and the New York chapter of the American Red Cross. They had two children: John J. McCloy II and Ellen Z. McCloy.

== World War I ==
McCloy enrolled in Harvard Law School in 1916, and he was an average student. He was profoundly influenced by his experience at the Plattsburg Preparedness camps. When the US entered the war in April 1917, he joined the United States Army in May and was trained at Plattsburgh, New York and was commissioned as a second lieutenant in the Artillery on August 15, 1917. He was promoted to first lieutenant on December 29. In May 1918 he was assigned as an aide to Brigadier General Guy H. Preston, commander of the 160th Field Artillery Brigade of the 85th Division. He sailed for France for service with the American Expeditionary Forces (AEF) on July 29, 1918. He saw combat service in the last weeks of the war, as commander of an artillery battery during the Meuse–Argonne offensive.

After the armistice of November 11, 1918, he was transferred to General Headquarters of the AEF in Chaumont, Haute-Marne, France, on March 1, 1919. He was then sent to the Advance General Headquarters in Trier, Germany and was promoted to captain on June 29. McCloy returned to the US on July 20 and resigned from the army on August 15, 1919. He then returned to Harvard where he received his LL.B. degree in 1921.

== Wall Street lawyer ==
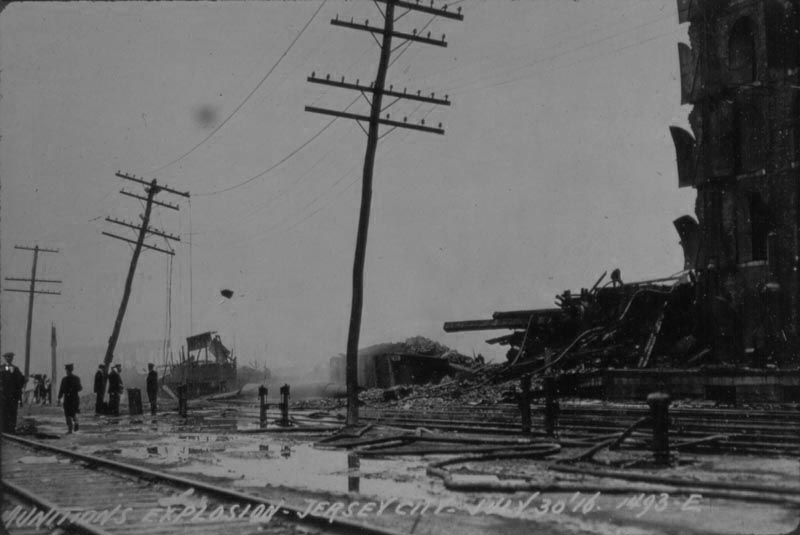
During WW I, undercover German agents sabotaged a munitions factory to prevent arms supplies to Entente countries. This is the aftermath of the Black Tom explosion, which John McCloy helped uncover.

McCloy went to New York to become an associate in the firm of Cadwalader, Wickersham & Taft, which was then one of the nation's most prestigious law firms. He moved to Cravath, Henderson, & de Gersdorff in 1924, where he worked with many wealthy clients, such as the St. Paul Railroad. In 1934, McCloy found new evidence allowing him to re-open an action for damages against Germany for the destruction caused by the 1916 Black Tom explosion.

McCloy subsequently undertook much work on behalf of corporations in Nazi Germany and advised the major German chemical combine I.G. Farben, later the manufacturer of the Zyklon B gas used in the Nazi extermination camps. By the time he left Germany for the US to serve in government, in 1940, McCloy was earning about $45,000 a year ($835,000 in 2020 dollars) and had savings of $106,000 ($2,000,000 in 2020 dollars). His involvement in litigation over a World War I sabotage case gave him a strong interest in intelligence issues and in German affairs.

== World War II ==
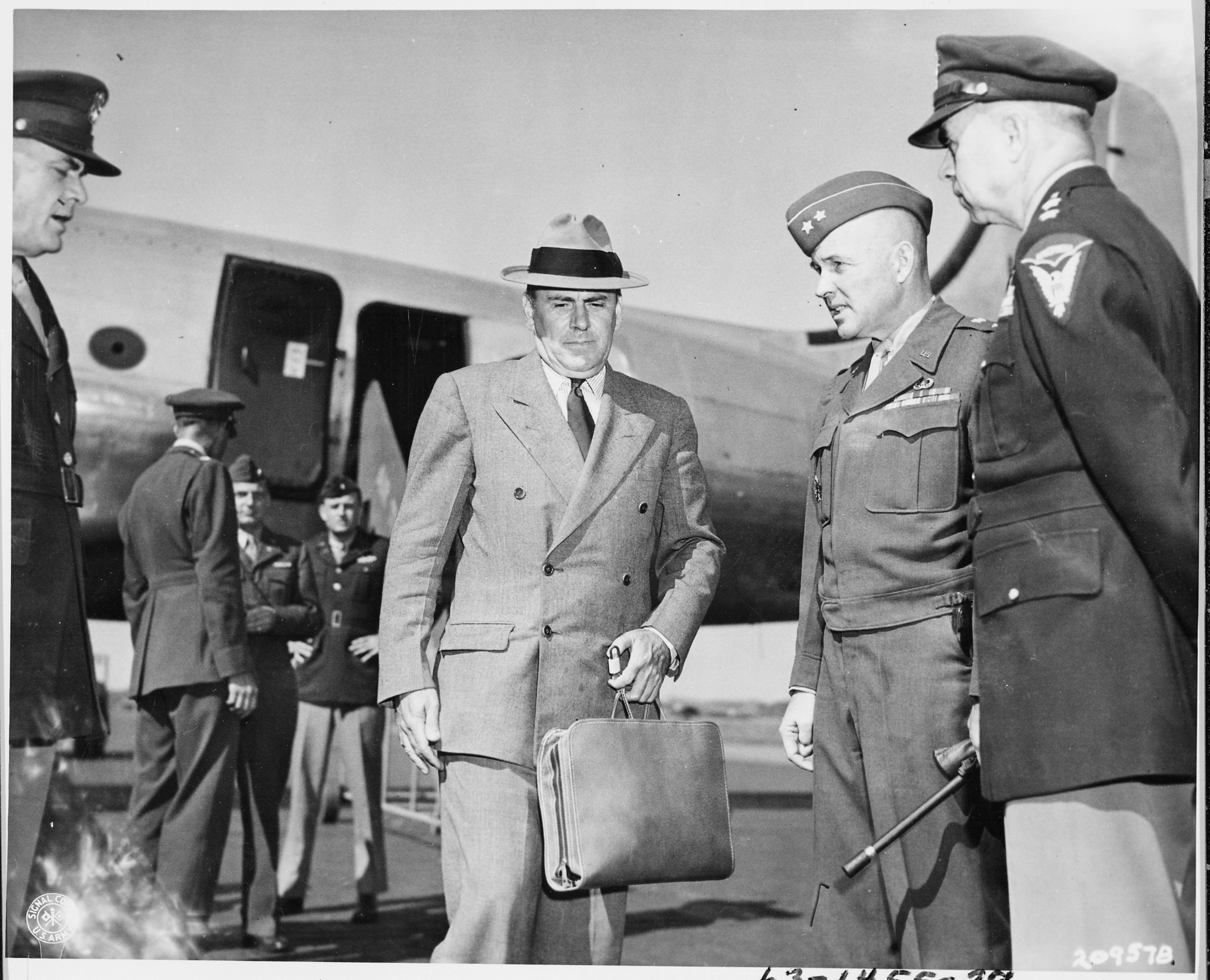
McCloy arrives at RAF Gatow in Berlin to attend the Potsdam Conference in 1945.

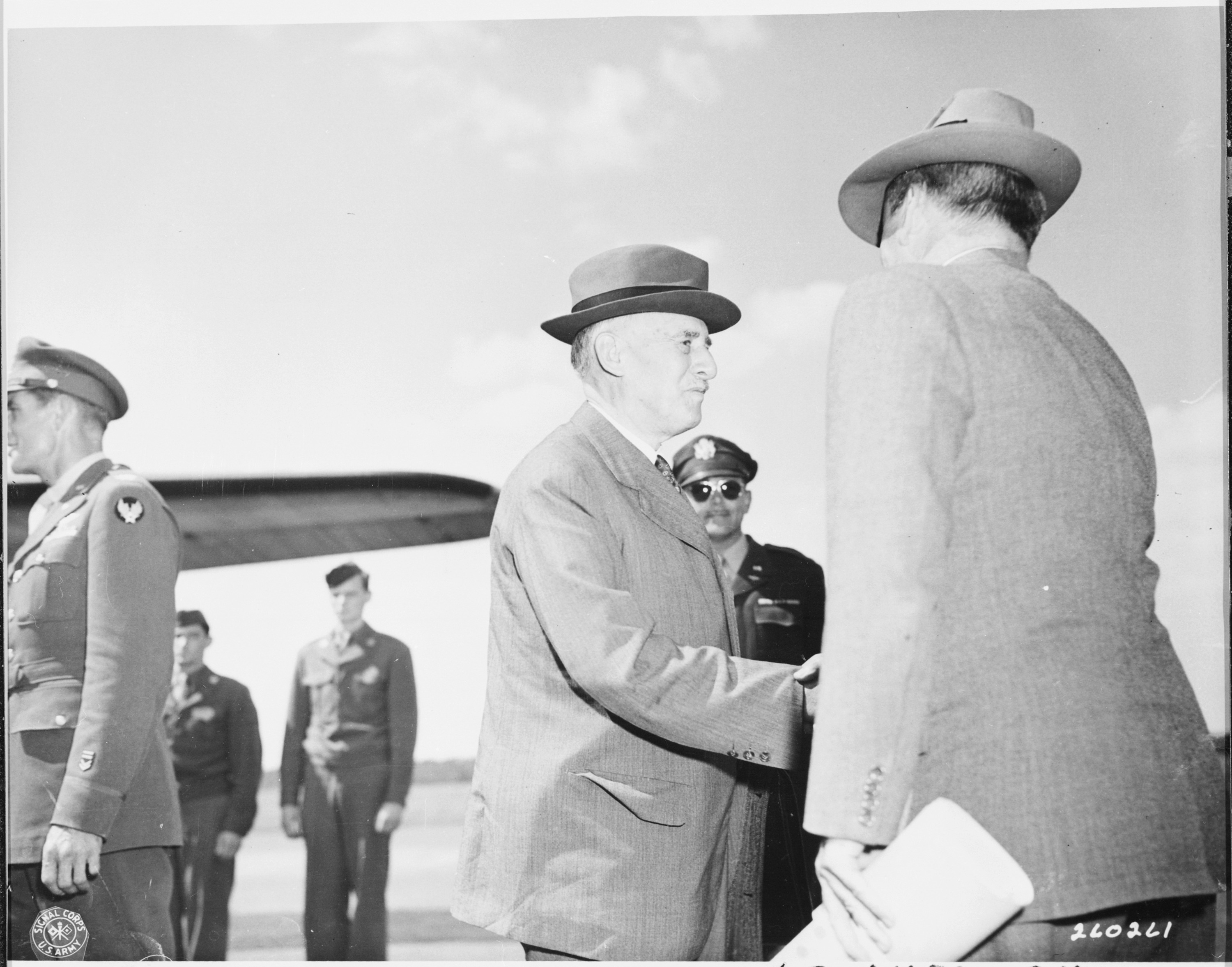
Secretary of War Henry Stimson greets his assistant John McCloy at RAF Gatow.

US Secretary of War Henry Stimson hired McCloy as a consultant in September 1940, even though McCloy was a Republican Party supporter and opposed Franklin Roosevelt for the upcoming November 1940 presidential election.

Stimson was particularly interested in McCloy due to McCloy's extensive experience with German sabotage in the Black Tom case. Stimson knew that the Germans would once again try to sabotage American infrastructure if a war against the United States were to break out. Working for Stimson, McCloy became immersed in war planning. On April 22, 1941, he was made Assistant Secretary of War but held only civilian responsibilities, especially the purchase of war materials for the Army, Lend Lease, the draft, and issues of intelligence and sabotage. Once the USA entered the war, McCloy was a crucial voice in setting US military priorities and played a key role in several notable decisions.

=== Creating a wartime security apparatus ===
An indefatigable committee member, McCloy during the war served on the government task forces that built the Pentagon, created the Office of Strategic Services, which eventually became the Central Intelligence Agency, and he proposed both the United Nations and the war crimes tribunals. He chaired the predecessor to the National Security Council.

=== Internment of Japanese-Americans ===
In February 1942, his involvement in combating sabotage made McCloy heavily involved in the decision to forcibly remove Japanese-Americans from their homes on the West Coast to inland internment camps. Kai Bird wrote in his biography of McCloy:

More than any individual, McCloy was responsible for the decision, since the (U.S.) President had delegated the matter to him through (U.S. Secretary of War) Stimson.

The generals on the scene had insisted on mass relocation to prevent sabotage, and the Army's G-2 (intelligence division) concluded that it was needed. A key document was a Magic-decrypted interception of a Japanese diplomat in Los Angeles, who reported, "We also have connections with our second generations working in airplane plants for intelligence purposes." The Office of Naval Intelligence (ONI) disagreed with the Army; in a concurrent report prepared by Commander Kenneth Ringle, ONI had argued against mass internment because most of the Japanese-American citizens suspected of espionage or sabotage were already under surveillance or in FBI custody. McCloy was responsible for supervising the evacuations to the camps, but the camps were run by a civilian agency.

The actions were unanimously upheld by the Supreme Court. By 1945, the judicial consensus had eroded considerably. Three justices dissented in a similar internment challenge brought by Fred Korematsu. The dissenters were led by Justice Frank Murphy's reversal of his reluctant concurrence in the earlier case of Gordon Hirabayashi. Historian Roger Daniels says McCloy was strongly opposed to reopening the judicial verdicts on the constitutionality of the internment. The dissent eventually led to judicial reversal of the criminal convictions of Hirabayashi, Korematsu, and others on the basis of government misconduct including the deliberate suppression of the ONI's Ringle report during the Supreme Court's deliberations in 1943.

Edward Ennis, a former colleague and Justice Department lawyer tasked with the preparation of the government's briefs to the Supreme Court in the Hirabayashi case, would directly accuse McCloy of personal deception in testimony before the Seattle Federal Court's 1985 coram nobis review. That led directly to the final resolution, in 1987, of the internment cases before the Ninth Circuit Court of Appeals, which fully exonerated Hirabayashi and other Japanese-American citizens, who fought the wartime curfews and forced relocations resulting from Army orders which the three-judge panel unanimously held were "based upon racism rather than military necessity."

=== Bombing of Auschwitz ===
The War Department was petitioned throughout late 1944 to help save Nazi-held prisoners by ordering the bombing of the railroad lines leading to Auschwitz and the gas chambers in the camp. McCloy responded in a letter dated July 4, 1944 to John W. Pehle of the War Refugee Board, "The War Department is of the opinion that the suggested air operation is impracticable. It could be executed only by the diversion of considerable air support essential to the success of our forces now engaged in decisive operations and would in any case be of such doubtful efficacy that it would not amount to a practical project." "In fact, long range American bombers stationed in Italy had flown over Auschwitz several times that spring in search of the I.G. Farben petrochemical plant nearby."

In another series of letters, A. Leon Kubowitzki of the World Jewish Congress requested on August 9, 1944 that McCloy consider a message sent to them by Ernest Frischer of the Czechoslovak State Council from the War Refugee Board. Frischer believed that "destruction of gas chambers and crematoria in Oswiecim by bombing would have a certain effect," and that "bombing of railway communications in this same area would also be of importance and of military interest." On the August 14, 1944 McCloy responded to Kubowitzki with a letter detailing how the operation would "be of such doubtful efficacy that it would not warrant the use of our resources," adding that "even if practicable, might provoke even more vindictive action by the Germans."

On November 8, 1944, McCloy received another letter from Pehle, now urging McCloy to speak with the War Department and reconsider their refusal to conduct the bombings. Pehle described how he was "hesitant to urge the destruction of these camps by direct, military action," but felt differently after reading a report from two escapees from Auschwitz who described the conditions of the death camp. McCloy had no direct authority over the Army Air Forces and could not overrule its choice of targets; the Army Air Forces, led by General Hap Arnold was adamantly opposed to any outside civilian group choosing its targets. Roosevelt himself rejected any such proposals.

=== Preserving Rothenburg ob der Tauber ===
In March 1945, Rothenburg ob der Tauber was defended by German soldiers. Since McCloy knew about the historic importance and beauty of Rothenburg, he ordered US Army General Jacob L. Devers not to use artillery in taking Rothenburg. Battalion commander Frank Burke, a future Medal of Honor winner, ordered six soldiers of the 12th Infantry Regiment, 4th Division to march into Rothenburg on a three-hour mission and negotiate the surrender of the town.

When stopped by a German soldier, one of the six soldiers, Private Lichey, who spoke fluent German and served as the group's translator, held up a white flag and explained, "We are representatives of our division commander. We bring you his offer to spare the city of Rothenburg from shelling and bombing if you agree not to defend it. We have been given three hours to get this message to you. If we haven't returned to our lines by 1800 hours, the town will be bombed and shelled to the ground." The local military commander Major Thömmes gave up the town, ignoring the order of Hitler for all towns to fight to the end and thereby saving it from total destruction by artillery. American troops of the 12th Infantry Regiment, 4th Division occupied the town on April 17, 1945, and in November 1948, McCloy was named an honorary citizen (German: Ehrenbürger) of Rothenburg.

=== Ending war with Japan ===
McCloy tried to convince President Truman that an invasion of Japan was not sensible. By mid-1945, the Japanese emperor began looking for ways to unwind the war, going as far as asking the Soviet Union to broker a peace between the United States and Japan. Through Magic intercepts, McCloy had known that the emperor was prepared to surrender if assurances to preserve the Japanese monarchy were given. As such, he advised Truman to offer terms of surrender that offered such a guarantee bundled with the implied threat of using the atomic bomb against Japan. He argued that by doing so, it would enable the United States to claim a moral high ground, in the event that a bombing would be needed to thwart a Japanese mainland invasion. While traveling by boat to the Potsdam Conference, Secretary of State James Byrnes convinced Truman to ignore McCloy's advice. Eventually, Truman ordered the atomic bombs to be dropped as soon as they were ready.

=== Rejection of the Morgenthau Plan ===
In 1945, he and Stimson convinced President Truman to reject the Morgenthau Plan and to avoid stripping Germany of its industrial capacity.

=== Ending segregation ===
As chairman of the Army's Advisory Committee on Negro Troop Policy, he at first opposed the civil rights spokesman who wanted the Army to end segregation. However, he changed his mind and in late 1945, just before leaving the government to return to Wall Street, he proposed ending segregation in the military. On March 17, 1949, McCloy and General Alvan Cullom Gillem, Jr. testified before the President's Committee on Equality of Treatment and Opportunity in the Armed Services.

== Later career ==
=== President of World Bank ===
From March 1947 to June 1949, McCloy served as the second president of the World Bank. At the time of his appointment, the World Bank was a new entity, having only been manned by one previous president, Eugene Meyer, who resigned six months into his tenure over disputes with the bank's executive directors. McCloy was brought in to resolve the situation and was determined to make the bank an entity that would fund economically efficient projects, not just consumption. Over this tenure, he would develop relationships with Wall Street to overcome their skepticism of these bonds from countries, selling over hundreds of millions of dollars in bonds. Eventually, McCloy would leave the World Bank, as the Marshall Plan would start giving vast sums of economic support in 1948 for Allied countries that would swamp the investment the World Bank could provide.

=== US High Commissioner for Germany ===
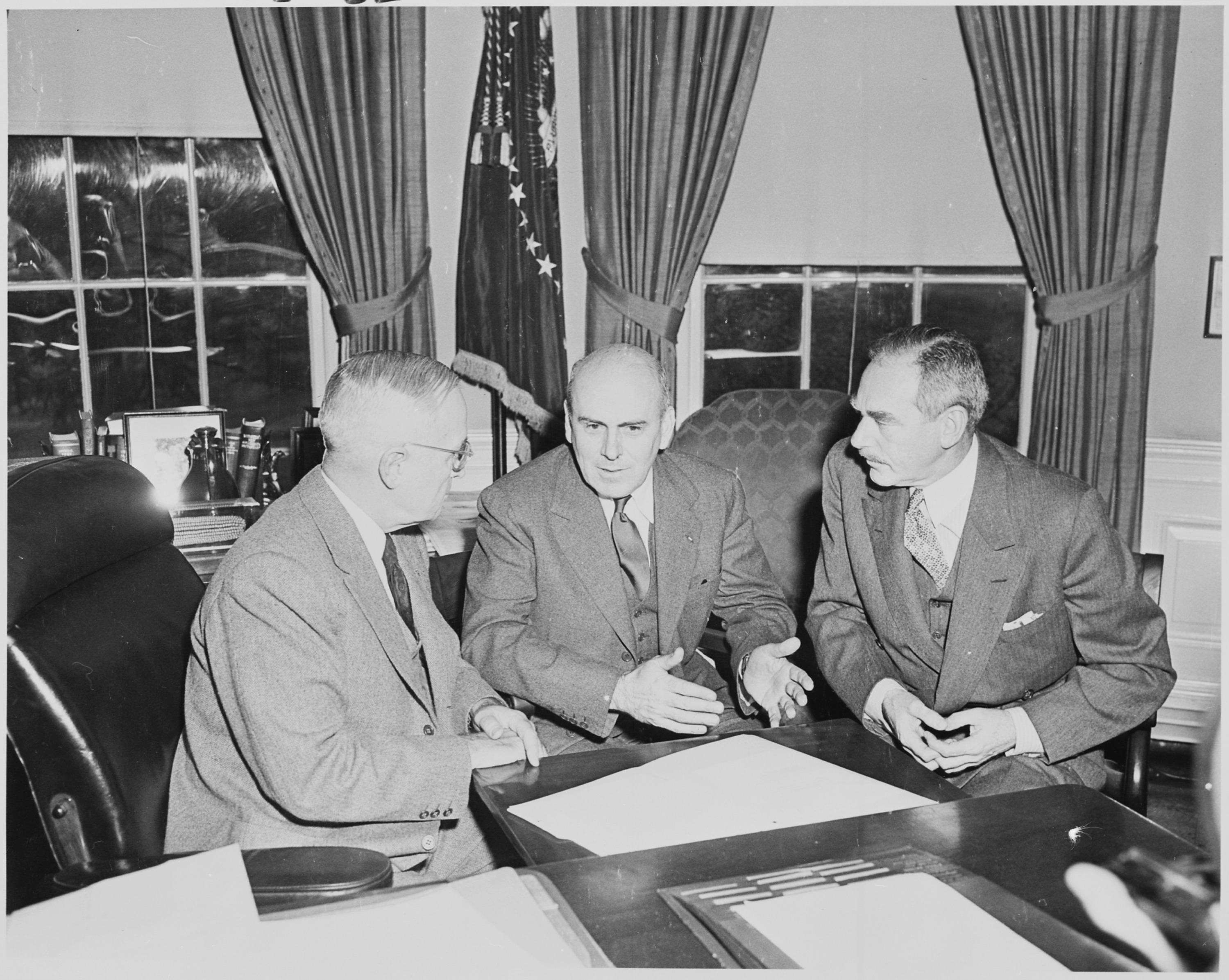
John McCloy meets President Truman and Secretary of State Dean Acheson for talks in the Oval Office.

On September 2, 1949, McCloy replaced the previous five successive military governors for the US Zone in Germany as the first US High Commissioner for Germany and held the position until August 1, 1952. He oversaw the further creation of the Federal Republic of Germany after May 23, 1949.

At the strong urging of the West German government and under massive pressure from the West German public, McCloy approved recommendations (including from the Peck Panel) for commuting the sentences of Nazi criminals, including those of prominent industrialist Alfried Krupp, General Hellmuth Felmy, and Einsatzgruppe commanders Gustav Adolf Nosske and Martin Sandberger. He also commuted the sentence of Ernst von Weizsäcker at the urging of Winston Churchill. Another commutation handed down was for Edmund Veesenmayer who'd played a role in mass deportations. McCloy granted the restitution of Krupp's entire property. Nuremberg judge William J. Wilkins wrote,

Imagine my surprise one day in February 1951 to read in the newspaper that John J. McCloy, the high commissioner to Germany, had restored all the Krupp properties that had been ordered confiscated.

McCloy rejected requests for a general amnesty. He also refused to commute the death sentences of five men whom he called "the worst of the worst": Oswald Pohl, Otto Ohlendorf, Paul Blobel, Werner Braune, and Erich Naumann. (Two other death sentences from the Dachau trials were upheld by General Thomas T. Handy, that of Georg Schallermair and Hans-Theodor Schmidt.) There were mass protests by hundreds of thousands amongst the West German public and pressure from their government. Many Germans were outraged that full amnesty had not been granted to the condemned; passions reached the point whereby McCloy's family started receiving death threats. Nevertheless, all seven men were executed at Landsberg Prison on June 7, 1951.

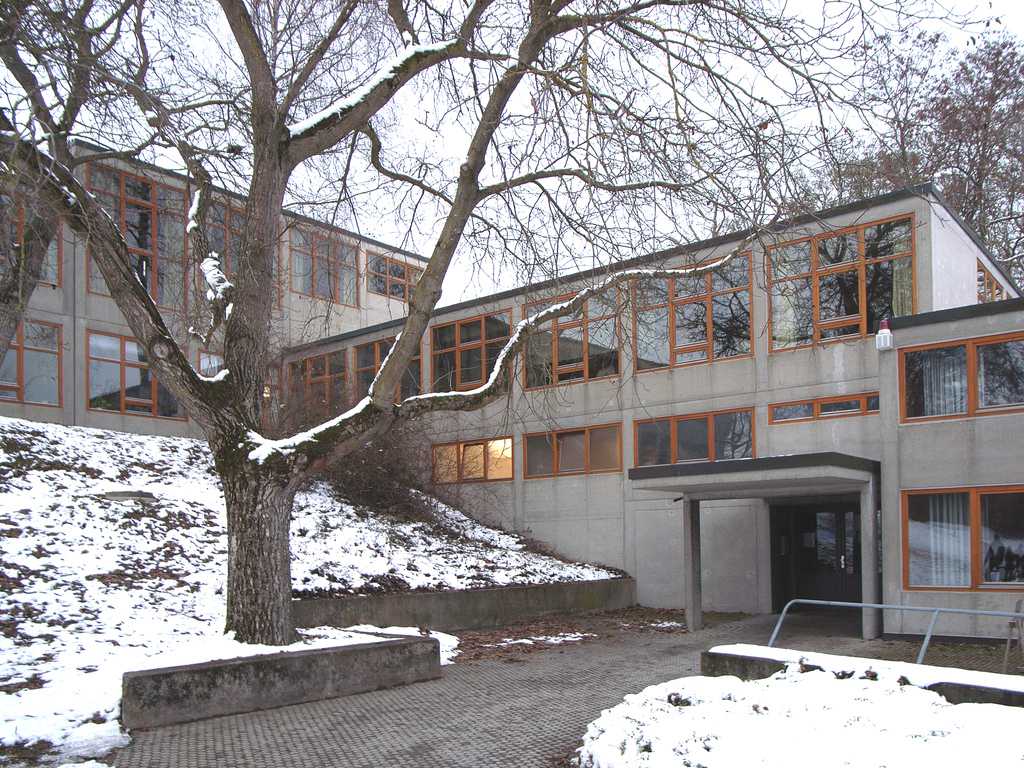
Ulm School of Design (Hochschule für Gestaltung—HfG Ulm) 1953–68

McCloy supported the initiative of Inge Aicher-Scholl (the sister of Sophie Scholl), Otl Aicher and Max Bill to found the Ulm School of Design. HfG Ulm went on to be considered the most influential design school in the world after the Bauhaus. The founders sought and received support in the USA (via Walter Gropius) and within the American High Command in Germany. McCloy saw the endeavor as "Project No. 1" and supported a college and campus combination along US examples. In 1952, Scholl received from McCloy a check for one million Deutschmarks. McCloy had served as the first US High Commissioner. His final successor in the post was the fourth US High Commissioner, James B. Conant; the office was terminated on May 5, 1955.

=== Return to Wall Street ===
Following his service in Germany, he served as chairman of the Chase Manhattan Bank from 1953 to 1960 (operating as "Chase National Bank" prior to 1955), and as chairman of the Ford Foundation from 1958 to 1965; he was also a trustee of the Rockefeller Foundation from 1946 to 1949, and then again from 1953 to 1958, before he took up the position at Ford. Following the 1953 death of Chief Justice Fred M. Vinson, President Eisenhower considered appointing McCloy in his place, but he was viewed as too favourable to big business.

From 1954 to 1970, he was chairman of the prestigious Council on Foreign Relations in New York, to be succeeded by David Rockefeller, who had worked closely with him at the Chase Bank. McCloy had a long association with the Rockefeller family, going back to his early Harvard days when he taught the young Rockefeller brothers how to sail. He was also a member of the Draper Committee, formed in 1958 by Eisenhower. He later served as adviser to John F. Kennedy, Lyndon Johnson, Richard Nixon, Jimmy Carter and Ronald Reagan, and was the primary negotiator on the Presidential Disarmament Committee.

From 1966 to 1968, he was Honorary Chairman of the Paris-based Atlantic Institute. In late 1967, McCloy was considered by US President Lyndon Johnson for the position of US Ambassador to the United Nations and was approached by Secretary of State Dean Rusk on this matter; however, McCloy turned down the offer.

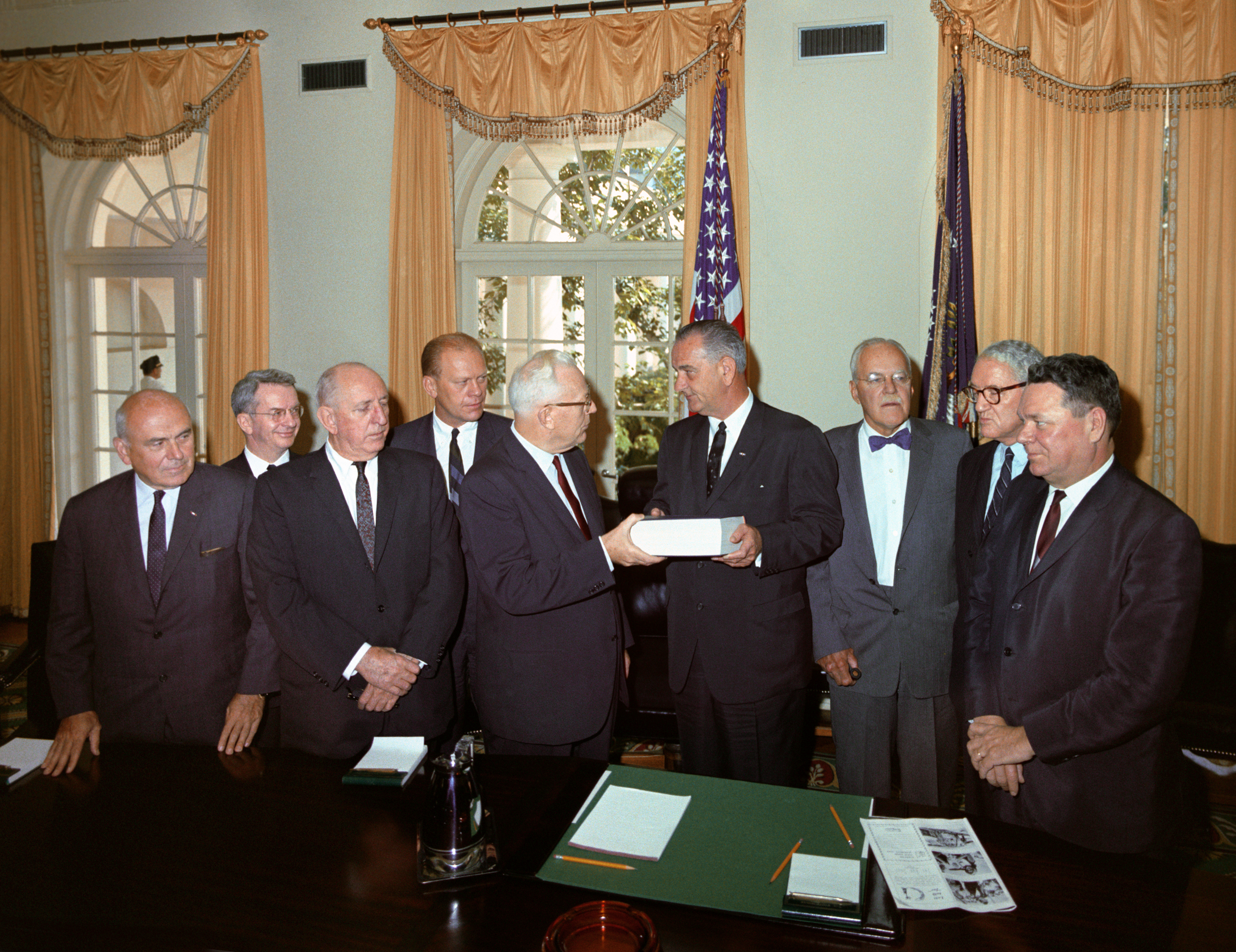
John McCloy (far left) and the Warren Commission present their report to President Johnson.

=== Warren Commission ===
McCloy was selected by President Lyndon Johnson to serve on the Warren Commission in late November 1963. McCloy believed that the commission ought to "show the world that America is not a banana republic, where a government can be changed by conspiracy". Notably, he was initially skeptical of the lone gunman theory, but a trip to Dallas with CIA veteran Allen Dulles, an old friend also serving on the commission, convinced him of the case against Lee Harvey Oswald. To avoid a minority dissenting report, McCloy brokered the final consensus and the crucial wording of the primary conclusion of the final report. He stated that any possible evidence of a conspiracy was "beyond the reach" of all of America's investigatory agencies, principally the FBI and the CIA as well as the Commission itself. In a 1975 interview with Eric Sevareid of CBS, McCloy stated, "I never saw a case that I thought was more completely proven than... the assassination." He described writings that propagated assassination conspiracies theories as "just nonsense".

=== Return to law firm ===
McCloy became a name partner in the Rockefeller-associated prominent New York law firm Milbank, Tweed, Hadley & McCloy. He would serve there from 1945 to 1947, and then after serving on the Warren Commission, remained a general partner for 27 years, until he died in 1989. In that capacity, he acted for the "Seven Sisters", the leading multinational oil companies, including Exxon, in their initial confrontations with the nationalization movement in Libya as well as negotiations with Saudi Arabia and OPEC. Because of his stature in the legal world and his long association with the Rockefellers and as a presidential adviser, he was sometimes referred to as the "Chairman of the American Establishment".

== Death ==
McCloy died of pulmonary edema at his home in Cos Cob, a neighborhood of Greenwich, Connecticut, on March 11, 1989. His wife had died at 87 a few years earlier of Parkinson's disease.

== Legacy ==
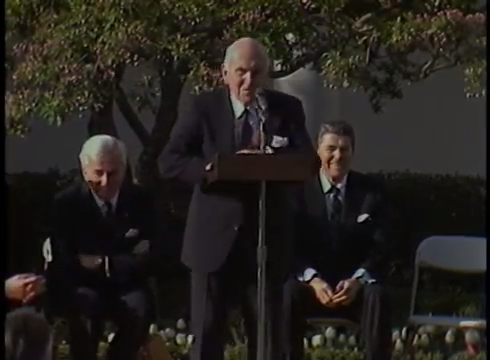
John McCloy accepts an award for an honorary citizen of Berlin as President von Weizsacker and President Ronald Reagan look on.

Without regard to partisanship, he served under presidents of both parties. Although a Republican, he was the second-highest-ranking official in the War Department during World War II. Like his fellow "Wise Men," McCloy often heeded the call to service. Despite having lucrative jobs on Wall Street, he left his positions to serve in government, whether to serve in the War Department or as the High Commissioner in Germany.

He was and remains a highly controversial figure. Despite his consistent presence in the highest echelons of government and powerful influence, it has been argued McCloy has achieved the status of a person of infamy within the United States' history. Both shortly following and contemporaneously his decisions have been questioned for their necessity, legality and how they appeared to be strongly racially motivated. Being the driving force behind Japanese Internment in World War Two, suppressing evidence that indicated it was not necessary, resisting repeated calls to destroy the death camp apparatus at Auschwitz with artillery or aerial bombardment and opposing the desegregation of the military until a last minute about turn, possibly motivated by the self awareness of and desire to not have his legacy entirely be based around racial bias, have been what scholarship around him have largely focused on. The lack of legal precedent and extreme nature of his decisions are widely controversial. At the time McCloy was quoted as saying "The Constitution is just a scrap of paper to me" and Interior Secretary Harold Ickes wrote in his diary that "many people thought McCloy was 'more or less inclined to be a Fascist.'" In 1981 McCloy would admit before the Commission on Wartime Relocation and Internment of Civilians that the Internment had not been about military necessity...but was the result of "retribution for the attack made on pearl harbor." Paul Finkelman writing for the Columbia Journal of Race and Law in 2024 would argue that "In other words, McCloy admitted that in implementing and defending the internment he misled the Court and the nation in order to incarcerate in concentration camps... completely innocent Americans because of their race and shared ethnicity with the people from another country who had attacked the United States. This also included McCloy admitting to having "orchestrated the withholding of critical information from the government."

McCloy is also remembered for his role in forming the predecessor of the Central Intelligence Agency. He was tasked by Henry Stimson in the early 1940s to sort out the political tensions in the pre-war intelligence community, which was marked by political infighting and jurisdictional disputes among the chiefs of the Army and Navy and the FBI director, J. Edgar Hoover. To sort out the issue, he and William Donovan created a new intelligence program, Office of Strategic Services, that attempted to fuse and streamline those forms of intelligence and is modeled after the British intelligence agencies. The centralization of the war intelligence office became a blueprint for the founding of the Central Intelligence Agency under the National Security Act of 1947.

In recognition of his efforts to the United States, he was presented with the Presidential Medal of Freedom with Distinction by President Lyndon B. Johnson on December 6, 1963. In the same year, he was awarded the Office of Strategic Services (OSS) Society's William J. Donovan Award. Also in 1963, McCloy received the Sylvanus Thayer Award by the United States Military Academy for his service to the country. Furthermore, McCloy was a recipient of the Association Medal of the New York City Bar Association in recognition of exceptional contributions to the honor and standing of the Bar in the community.

On his 90th birthday on the White House lawn with President Ronald Reagan overlooking, John McCloy was named an honorary citizen of Berlin by German President Richard von Weizsacker and the mayor of Berlin, Eberhard Diepgen. At the event, Ronald Reagan recalled how "John McCloy's selfless heart made a difference, an enduring difference, in the lives of millions" and thanked him on behalf of "for all [McCloy's] countrymen and the millions of people around the world whose lives [McCloy] helped make safer because of your devotion to duty and to the cause of humanity." The citation for his honorary citizenship reads "John McCloy is closely connected with the reconstruction and development of this city. His dedication contributed to a great extent to understanding of Berlin in the United States of America and to preservation of peace and freedom."

== Publications ==
Articles

- "The World Seeks Peace". American Journal of Economics and Sociology, vol. 20, no. 4 (Jul. 1961), p. 376. JSTOR 3484375.

Book contributions

- Introduction to Russia and America, Dangers and Prospects, by Henry L. Roberts. New York: Published by Harper on behalf of the Council on Foreign Relations (1956).

Correspondence

- 1947–1949: As President of the World Bank, available at the World Bank Group Archive.

Public speaking

- Address as President of the World Bank presenting the third annual report of the Bank to the Board of Governors at the second session, September 29, 1948 (English). Washington, D.C.: World Bank Group.

== See also ==
- Chase Manhattan Bank
- Council on Foreign Relations
- Japanese American internment
- McCloy–Zorin Accords
- Milbank, Tweed, Hadley & McCloy
- David Rockefeller
- Rockefeller family
- The World at War, "The Bomb"
- World Bank Group

Diplomatic posts
Preceded by Eugene Meyer	President of the World Bank Group; 1947–1949	Succeeded by Gene Black
New office	American High Commissioner for Occupied Germany; 1949–1952	Succeeded by James Conant
Vacant Title last held by Harold Stassen; 1958 as Special Assistant to the President for Disarmament	Director of the Disarmament Administration; 1961	Succeeded by William Foster as Director of the Arms Control and Disarmament Agency
Business positions
Preceded by Winthrop Aldrich	Chief Executive Officer of Chase; 1953–1960	Succeeded by George Champion
Awards
Preceded by Douglas MacArthur	Recipient of the Sylvanus Thayer Award; 1963	Succeeded by Robert Lovett
