= Fund platform =

A fund platform or investment platform is an online service that allows investments to be bought online. Fund platforms may simplify the process of investing or provide investments at a discounted rate.

== Use ==
In many cases, investments purchased on a fund platform can then be held on the platform in a range of tax efficient wrappers. They can be used to purchase shares, bonds and a range of funds from different fund managers. The investments that can be purchased via each platform vary depending on the service provider.

Fund platforms enable investors to buy and hold their investments online, all in one place, with a degree of flexibility to alter their investments. Many provide the opportunity to buy assets in-specie, which helps the investor switch investments without unnecessary charges. These services also cut down on paperwork as transactions are centralized.

== Types ==
Fund platforms fall into two distinct groups: fund wraps and fund supermarkets. Wrap services are online services where investors access their account details online. Fund supermarkets are generally more transactional and are used for buying funds cheaply online, either by a financial adviser (on behalf of a client) or by the investor themselves.

== United Kingdom ==
In the United Kingdom, individual investors can usually hold a range of investments within several different types of 'tax wrapper', such as:

- Individual savings accounts (ISAs)
- EPPs
- QSPs or MIPS
- Personal equity plans (PEPs)
- offshore or onshore investment bonds (also called insurance bonds)
- personal pension plan, either insured personal pensions or Self-invested personal pension (SIPPs).

The investments you can buy via these services and often hold on the platform itself can include:

- direct mutual funds (i.e. unit trust or OEIC) or investment trust or SICAV holdings
- individual equities, corporate bonds
- cash
- ETFs
- VCTs
- hedge funds
- gilts
- structured products
- property partnerships.

== See also ==
- Wrap account
- Trading platform
