= Endowment mortgage =

Loan arranged on an interest-only basis

An endowment mortgage is a mortgage loan arranged on an interest-only basis where the capital is intended to be repaid by one or more (usually Low-Cost) endowment policies. The phrase "endowment mortgage" is used mainly in the United Kingdom by lenders and consumers to refer to this arrangement and is not a legal term.

The borrower has two separate agreements: one with the lender for the mortgage and one with the insurer for the endowment policy. The arrangements are distinct, and the borrower can change either arrangement if they wish. In the past the endowment policy was often taken as an additional security by the lender. That is, the lender applied a legal device to ensure the proceeds of the endowment were made payable to them rather than the borrower; typically the policy is assigned to the lender. This practice is uncommon now.

== Reasons for an endowment mortgage ==
The customer pays only the interest on the capital borrowed, thus reducing the monthly payments in comparison with an ordinary repayment loan; the borrower also pays premiums into an endowment life-assurance policy. The intention is that the payout from the endowment policy when it matures will be sufficient to repay the mortgage at the end of the term, and possibly create a cash surplus.

Up to 1984, qualifying insurance contracts (including endowment policies) received tax relief on the premiums known as life assurance premium relief (LAPR). This gave a tax advantage for endowment mortgages over repayment mortgages, until the tax relief was ended in the March 1984 budget. The previous year, the tax relief on the mortgage interest had also been reduced by the introduction of MIRAS (mortgage interest relief at source), which restricted to the basic rate of tax the previously unlimited interest tax relief. Before these changes, a larger endowment mortgage could be advantageous, as, if the interest rate stayed constant, the tax relief on interest paid on a repayment mortgage was reduced over time, whereas interest on the full amount of the endowment mortgage and, hence, the tax relief it attracted remained constant to the end of the term.

An additional reason in favour of an endowment was that many lenders charge interest on an annual basis. This meant that any capital repaid on a monthly basis is not removed from the outstanding loan until the end of the year thus increasing the real rate of interest charged. In such a situation, payments into an endowment might benefit from any growth from the moment it is invested. However, this was balanced against the higher interest rates that lenders generally charged for endowment mortgages compared with repayment mortgages.

== Traded endowment policies ==
Traded endowment policies (TEPs) or second-hand endowment policies (SHEPs) are traditional with-profits endowments that have been sold to a new owner part way through their term. The TEP market enables buyers (investors) to buy unwanted endowment policies for more than the surrender value offered by the insurance company. Investors will pay more than the surrender value because the policy has greater value if it is kept in force than if it is terminated early. When a policy is sold, all beneficial rights on the policy are transferred to the new owner. The new owner takes on responsibility for future premium payments and collects the maturity value when the policy matures or the death benefit when the original life assured dies. Policyholders who sell their policies, no longer benefit from the life cover and should consider whether to take out alternative cover. The TEP market deals exclusively with Traditional With Profits policies. The easiest way of determining whether an endowment policy is in this category is to check to see whether it mentions units, indicating it is a Unitised With Profits or Unit Linked policy; if bonuses are in sterling and there is no mention of units, then it is probably a traditional With Profits. The other types of policies - “Unit Linked” and “Unitised With Profits—have a performance factor which is dependent directly on current investment market conditions. These are not tradable, as the guarantees on the policy are much lower and there is no gap between the surrender value and the market value.

== Problems with endowment mortgages ==
The underlying premise with endowment policies being used to repay a mortgage is that the premiums plus growth of the investment will be adequate to repay the loan when it falls due. Toward the end of the 1980s, when endowment mortgage selling was at its peak, the anticipated growth rate for endowment policies was high (7-12% per annum). By the middle of the 1990s, the change in the economy toward lower inflation made the assumptions of a few years ago look optimistic.

Significantly, endowment mortgages continued to grow in the 1980s even after life assurance premium relief had been abolished in 1984. Moreover, their share of the mortgage market held up in the 1990s despite the fact that the Treasury began to steadily reduce MIRAS (mortgage interest relief at source), which also worked in favour of interest-only mortgages, and despite a prolonged period of relatively low inflation (something which worked against interest-only mortgages). The fact that endowment mortgages were later found to have been systematically mis-sold probably explains this disjunction.

Regulation of investment advice and a growing awareness of the potential for regulatory action against the insurers lead to a reduction in anticipated growth rates down to 7.5% and eventually as low as 4% per annum. By 2001 the sale of endowments to repay a mortgage was virtually seen as taboo.

=== Shortfalls ===
Financial regulations introduced compulsory re-projection letters to show existing endowment holders what the likely maturity value of their endowment would be, assuming standard growth rates.

This, in turn, led to a dramatic rise in complaints of mis-selling and spawned a secondary industry that 'handles' complaints on behalf of consumers for a fee, even though they can pursue it themselves for free.

In many cases, because risk warnings were not made as clearly as they are in today's investment market, courts have found against the insurer or broker responsible for the original advice and have required them to restore their customers to the financial position they would have been in had they taken out a repayment mortgage instead. As of July 2006, UK banks and insurance providers have paid out approximately £2.2 billion in compensation.
