= Life assurance premium relief =

Life assurance premium relief (LAPR) was a United Kingdom taxation rule.

It is a tax break that may apply to life assurance policies that provide for a capital sum to be paid on death, where the policy commenced prior to 14 March 1984.

It is due in respect of premiums payable under any such life assurance policy issued in respect of an insurance made before 20 March 1968. For such policies entered into between 20 March 1968 and 13 March 1984, the policy must also be a qualifying policy. "Qualifying policy" is defined in Schedule 15 of the Income and Corporation Taxes Act 1988.

HMRC planned to abolish LAPR from 6 April 2015
