= Wrap account =

A wrap account (also known as wrap service or tax wrapper) is a means of consolidating and managing an investor's investment portfolio and financial plans. Wrap-fee services are offered by many financial institutions. Often, wrap services are offered for a fee or a series of charges. These charges cover all administrative and management costs. This type of service is also sometimes known as an investment platform or financial platform service.

== History ==
By the mid-1990s, major American brokerage companies were offering wrap accounts. By 1994, fees that formerly were at 3% were falling, as was the minimum investment amount.

Wrap services were offered in Australia and New Zealand before coming to the UK (about 2000).As of 2010, approximately £230 billion of assets are held on wrap services in the UK. Transact was the first wrap service to be authorised in the UK. With the Retail Distribution Review (RDR) being undertaken by the FSA in the UK, more investors are likely to move their investments onto Wrap Services by the end of 2012 if they have a financial adviser.

== Structure ==
Wrap services or accounts usually enable investors, usually with the advice of a financial adviser, to select from an extensive range of funds and assets – including Unit Trusts, OEICs, Investment Trusts, equities, gilts, cash, structured products, VCTs, Hedge Funds, ETFs, ETCs and other investment products. The service can then be used to allocate these assets to the most appropriate tax wrappers – including ISAs and pension plans. Both investors and advisers can then view a holistic picture online of the complete Portfolio – all in one place, from anywhere in the world – 24/7.

The potential benefits to investors are:

- They only have one counterparty to deal with. Saving a lot of time dealing with a diverse range of fund managers, financial institutions and other product providers
- Investors can view their entire Portfolio in one place, enabling them to keep track of their current financial position on a daily basis, however complex their financial affairs are
- They also receive a single consolidated annual tax statement, comprehensive six-monthly statements, documentation of all purchases, sales, deposits and withdrawals
- Some Wrap services make no charge for re-registering assets in specie, on or off the platform.

== See also ==
- Fund platform
- Investment vehicle
- Unit trust
