= Endowment policy =

Type of life insurance

An endowment policy is a life insurance contract designed to pay a lump sum after a specific term (on its 'maturity') or on death. These are long-term policies, often designed to repay a mortgage loan, with typical maturities between ten and thirty years within certain age limits. Some policies also insure additional risks, such as critical illness.

Policies are either traditional with-profits or unit-linked (including unitised with-profits funds). With both types of policy, the value varies with the underlying investments, but the mechanism by which growth is allocated varies. The sum insured remains payable on death or other insured events.

== Traditional with profits endowments ==
There is an amount guaranteed to be paid out called the sum assured and this can be increased on the basis of investment performance through the addition of periodic (for example annual) bonuses. Regular bonuses (sometimes referred to as reversionary bonuses) are guaranteed at maturity and a further non-guarantee bonus may be paid at the end known as a terminal bonus. During adverse investment condition reduced by a MVR (It is sometimes referred to as a market value adjustment but this is a term in decline through pressure from the Financial Conduct Authority to use clearer terms). The idea of such a measure is to protect the investors who remain in the fund from others withdrawing funds with notional values that are, or risk being, in excess of the value of underlying assets at a time when stock markets are low. If an MVA applies an early surrender would be reduced according to the policies adopted by the funds managers at the time.

== Unit-linked endowment ==
Unit-linked endowments are investments where the premium is invested in units of a unitised insurance fund. Units are encashed to cover the cost of the life assurance. Policyholders can often choose which funds their premiums are invested in and in what proportion. Unit prices are published on a regular basis and the encashment value of the policy is the current value of the units.

== Full endowments ==
A full endowment is a with-profits endowment where the basic sum assured is equal to the death benefit at start of policy and, assuming growth, the final payout would be much higher than the sum assured.

== Low cost endowment (LCE) ==
A low cost endowment is a medley of: an endowment where an estimated future growth rate will meet a target amount and a decreasing life insurance element to ensure that the target amount will be paid out as a minimum if death occurs (or a critical illness is diagnosed if included).

The main thing of a low cost endowment has been for endowment mortgages to pay off interest only mortgage at maturity or earlier death in favour of full endowment with the required premium would be much higher.

== Traded endowments ==
Traded Endowment Policies (TEPs) or Second Hand Endowment Policies (SHEPs) are conventional (sometimes referred to as traditional) with-profits endowments that have been sold to a new owner part way through their term. The TEP market enables buyers (investors) to buy unwanted endowment policies for more than the surrender value offered by the insurance company. Investors will pay more than the surrender value because the policy has greater value if it is kept in force than if it is terminated early.

When a policy is sold, all beneficial rights on the policy are transferred to the new owner. The new owner takes on responsibility for future premium payments and collects the maturity value when the policy matures or the death benefit when the original life assured dies. Policyholders who sell their policies no longer benefit from the life cover and should consider whether to take out alternative cover.

The TEP market deals almost exclusively with conventional With Profits policies. The easiest way of determining whether an endowment policy is in this category is to check to see whether your policy document mentions units, indicating it is a Unitised With Profits or Unit Linked policy. If bonuses are in sterling and there is no mention of units then it is probably a conventional With Profits endowment policy. The other types of policies - “Unit Linked” and “Unitised With Profits” have a performance factor which is dependent directly on current investment market conditions. These are not usually tradable as the guarantees on the policy are often much lower, and the discount between the surrender value and Asset Share (the true underlying value) is narrower.

== Modified endowments (U.S.) ==
Modified endowments were created in the Technical Corrections Act of 1988 (Text of H.R. 4333 (100th): Technical and Miscellaneous Revenue Act of 1988) (H.R 4333, S. 2238) in response to single-premium life (endowments) being used as tax shelters. The Act of 1988 established the 7-Pay Test, which is a stipulated premium that would create a guaranteed paid up policy within 7 years from policy inception. If premiums paid to the contract go beyond (i.e. are higher than) the premium amount stipulated then the contract has failed the 7-Pay Test and is reclassified as a Modified Endowment Contract. The following new tax rules apply to Modified Endowment Contracts:

Distributions will switch from a First In First Out (FIFO) basis to a Last In First Out (LIFO) basis. This means that withdrawals will require the policy owner to withdraw taxable gain before withdrawing untaxable basis.

Policy loans will be realized as ordinary income to the policy owner and could be subject to income taxes in the year the loan is made.

Distributions (either withdrawals or loans) that go beyond the policy basis will be subject to a 10% penalty tax for policy owners under the age of 59.5 (this can be avoided by the use of a 72(v) distribution)

Contract to a new life insurance policy via the 1035 exchange privilege will render the newly issued contract as Modified Endowment Contract as well.

This change to the law put an end to the widespread sale of traditional endowment policies in the United States such as Endowment at Age 65, Ten-Pay Endowment, Twenty-Pay Endowment, etc. These policies had already become far less popular and less widely offered in the years preceding this reform, both due to their very high cost relative to the sum insured and the widespread availability to the general public (at that time) of many other guaranteed investments with considerably higher rates of return than those contemplated within the traditional endowment plan.
