= Amortization =

Amortization or amortisation may refer to:

- The process by which loan principal decreases over the life of an amortizing loan
- Amortization (accounting), the expensing of acquisition cost minus the residual value of intangible assets in a systematic manner, or the completion of such a process
- Amortization (tax law), the cost recovery system for intangible property
- Amortized analysis, a method of analysing execution cost of algorithms
- Amortization (zoning), the time period a non-conforming property has to conform to a new zoning classification before the non-conforming use becomes prohibited
