= Unitised insurance fund =

Pooled investment funds linked to life assurance and pension policies

Unitised insurance funds, usually called unit-linked insurance funds or simply unit-linked funds, are pooled investment funds offered by life assurance companies through their life and pension policies. The policyholder's premiums are notionally converted into units in one or more funds, and the value of the policy at any time is determined by the number of units allocated to it and the prevailing unit price. Benefits under the contract are therefore linked to the performance of the underlying assets rather than being fixed in advance.

== Structure ==
A unitised insurance fund is an open-ended pooled investment made available through a life assurance or pension contract rather than sold to investors directly. The policyholder pays a premium, the insurer allocates a number of units in a fund the policyholder has chosen, and the value of the policy rises and falls with the value of the fund's underlying assets.

The difference between this and holding a mutual fund or unit trust directly is mainly legal. The insurer owns the underlying assets, and the policyholder holds a contractual claim against the insurer whose value is calculated by reference to those assets. The policyholder surrenders the policy or switches funds on the terms the policy sets, and those terms commonly permit the insurer to defer payment where the underlying assets cannot be realised quickly.

Legal protections enjoyed by the policyholder vary greatly between countries, in particular whether any party independent of the insurer is charged with holding or overseeing the assets, and where policyholders rank if the insurer fails. There is no international standard, and the arrangements differ substantially even between neighbouring markets. In the United Kingdom, for example, the insurer may manage, promote and hold the assets itself, with no depositary or trustee independent of it, which distinguishes unit-linked funds from authorised funds, where the trustee of an authorised unit trust must be independent of the authorised fund manager and the depositary of an investment company with variable capital must be independent of the company and its directors.

Even within the European Union, there is no single legal form for the protections enjoyed by the holder of a unit-linked policy. The Council of the European Union explicitly noted the absence of harmonised European procedures for resolving insurers and substantial differences between member states producing uneven levels of protection for policyholders. For example, Luxembourg providers describe the insurer as becoming owner of the premiums it receives, with the policyholder holding a receivable against the insurer in exchange. The Luxembourg arrangements are described by the Luxembourg industry itself as unique in Europe.

== Types of fund link ==
Insurers commonly distinguish between internally managed funds, run by the insurer's own investment team or an appointed manager, and externally managed funds — often called mirror funds — which give policyholders exposure to a third-party collective investment scheme (CIS) such as a well-known unit trust or OEIC. Because charges are levied at both the unit-linked and the underlying fund level, mirror funds are typically more expensive than an insurer's internal funds. Investing through a CIS does not reduce the insurer's obligations to its customers or its duty to comply with the unit-linked rules.

An insurer cannot invest directly in another insurer's unit-linked fund. Where it wishes to offer such a fund it does so by entering a reinsurance contract with the other insurer, a further form of external fund link. FCA rules require a firm that reinsures linked business to discharge its obligations to policyholders as though no reinsurance contract existed. Where a policy expressly passes the reinsurer's credit risk to the customer, the Financial Services Compensation Scheme would not cover the reinsurer's failure, since the customer's contract is with the primary insurer alone.

== See also ==
- Unit Linked Insurance Plan, the equivalent product in India
- Unit trust
- Open-ended investment company
- With-profits policy
