= Notional principal contract =

Tax clause in a contract in the United States

The term notional principal contract (NPC) is used by U.S. federal income tax professionals for contracts based on an underlying notional amount (other financial services professionals refer to such NPCs under the more general heading "swaps," although not all swaps are NPCs). The reason the underlying amount is "notional" is that neither party to the NPC is required to actually hold the property comprising the underlying amount. NPCs involve two parties who agree contractually to pay each other amounts at specified times, based on the underlying notional amount. The simplest example of an NPC is a so-called interest rate swap, in which one party (Party A) pays the other party (Party B) an amount each quarter determined by multiplying a floating, market-determined interest rate (e.g., LIBOR) by the notional amount; and Party B pays Party A on the same date an amount determined by multiplying a fixed interest rate by the notional amount.

== Definition provided in Treasury regulations ==
For U.S. federal income tax purposes, currently applicable Treasury regulations define a Notional Principal Contract as "a financial instrument that provides for the payment of amounts by one party to another at specified intervals calculated by reference to a specified index upon a notional principal amount in exchange for specified consideration or a promise to pay similar amounts." (Treas. Reg. § 1.446-3(c)(1)(i)). It is not defined in the Internal Revenue Code itself. Treasury Regulations § 1.446-3 provides extensive and detailed rules governing the taxation of NPCs in the United States. While the Treasury Regulations provide examples of contracts that are treated as NPCs, including "interest rate swaps, currency swaps, basis swaps, interest rate caps, interest rate floors, commodity swaps, equity swaps, and similar agreements." (Treas. Reg. § 1.446-3(c)(1)(i)), there are significant limitations on the types of contracts that may be treated as NPCs, particularly contracts that provide for an actual delivery of the underlying amount.

== Tax consequences ==
Any amounts received under an NPC must be recognized by the taxpayer in accordance with the rules governing the recognition of such payments in the Treasury regulations, which may override the taxpayer's normal method of accounting for U.S. federal income tax purposes. (Treas. Reg. § 1.446-3(e)(2)(i)). In general, amounts paid or received under an NPC are treated as ordinary income (and not capital gain) for U.S. federal income tax purposes, and are sourced by the residence of the recipient (e.g., if a non-U.S. resident receives a payment under an NPC, that payment is, in general, treated as non-U.S. source income for U.S. federal income tax purposes). The usual result of this treatment is that non-U.S. persons can receive payments on an NPC without outbound U.S. federal income tax withholding tax being applied. However, the U.S. federal income tax rules governing NPCs, withholding tax and the taxation of financial products, in general, is an intricately complicated subject, and taxpayers as a general matter almost always seek the assistance of a competent adviser to assist them in these matters.

A 2016 article in the AICPA Publication The Tax Adviser provides additional information about notional contracts.
