= Swap execution facility =

Trading platform for swaps

In the United States a swap execution facility (SEF) or swaps execution facility is a platform for financial swap trading that provides pre-trade information (i.e. bid and offer prices) and a mechanism for executing swap transactions among eligible participants.

Swap execution facilities are regulated by the Securities and Exchange Commission and the Commodity Futures Trading Commission. The regulated trading of certain swaps is a result of requirements in the United States by the Dodd–Frank Wall Street Reform and Consumer Protection Act (in particular Title VII). Financial swaps have traditionally been traded in over-the-counter (OTC) markets. However, regulatory changes have driven reporting, clearing, and settlement functions to SEFs, which are much more tightly regulated.

As of 2 October 2013, any swap listed by a SEF may be traded by the parties on the SEF, but may also be traded off-SEF in any other lawful manner. The swaps that must be traded on SEFs are both subject to a CFTC-centralized clearing mandate and have been determined to be "made available to trade" (MAT) by at least one SEF. Four categories of interest rate swaps and two categories of credit default swaps are currently subject to clearing mandates.

As of 2014 the European Union, have proposed similar changes in swap market structure but none have yet been adopted.

== Regulation ==
- The Securities and Exchange Commission (SEC) is responsible for regulating dealing and trading in security-based swaps, such as many equity swaps and credit default swaps. Proposed rules for security-based swap execution facilities (SB-SEFs) have been pending since 2011.
- The Commodity Futures Trading Commission (CFTC) is responsible for regulating the dealing and trading of a much wider range of over-the-counter derivatives, including interest-rate swaps, commodity-linked swaps and certain FX, credit default swaps, and equity swaps. CFTC Commissioner Bart Chilton suggested that the primary benefits will be greater transparency, improved price formation, and better regulatory compliance. The CFTC's final SEF rules went into effect in August 2013 and the first SEFs began operating in October 2013. Previously operating swap trading platforms with multiple-to-multiple trading capability within the regulatory definition of "swap execution facility" could no longer operate legally without registering with the CFTC. The SEF launch on October 2, 2013, was facilitated by a CFTC guidance letter and several conditional and time-limited grants of relief from enforcement against non-compliance with certain technical elements. However, the CFTC in its no-action letters did not grant relief for SEFs from the October 2, 2013 deadline requiring swap trading venues to register. The CFTC regulations further require SEF's to report certain data arising from the execution of a swap to a swap data repository either for real-time public dissemination or confidential regulatory use. Regulations require that if a swap is executed on a SEF, the SEF must provide written confirmation of the terms to each counterparty. After the CFTC certified Javelin Capital Markets SEF's Made Available to Trade (MAT) Submission on January 16, 2014, certain swaps were required to trade on SEFs as of February 15, 2014.

== Entities in the swaps industry ==
=== Established entities ===
- TrueEX Group
- ICAP (company)
- 360 Trading Networks
- AEGIS Markets
- Bloomberg L.P.
- BGC Partners
- CME Group
- LCH.Clearnet
- Eris Exchange
- Eurex
- FX Alliance Inc. (FXall) (NYSE: FX) engaged with National Futures Association to perform regulatory services
- GFI Group engaged with National Futures Association to perform regulatory services
- GTX SEF
- ICE Intercontinental Exchange Creditex
- IDC International Derivatives Clearinghouse
- Javelin Capital Markets
- LatAm SEF
- MarketAxess Holdings engaged with National Futures Association to perform regulatory services
- Nodal Exchange
- Clear Markets
- Parity Energy
- SwapEx State Street Corporation
- TeraExchange
- Thomson Reuters
- Tradeweb Tradeweb Thomson Financial
- Tradition
- Trumarx
- Tullett Prebon
- SuperDerivatives

Many of the foregoing entities, directly or through affiliates, have pending or temporarily approved SEF registrations with the CFTC. SEFs with temporary registrations may operate for up to two years while the CFTC completes a full review of the SEF's application on Form SEF.

=== Emerging entities ===
Note: above established entities section is for firms that had significant swaps business ahead of the sweeping regulatory reform. The following list is oriented to newer entrants (emerging after the Dodd-Frank Act), representing less established participants. As such this section will necessarily be more illustrative than fully up to date, and likely somewhat transitory.

- Broadway Technology
- Cleartrade Exchange
- ClearingandSettlement.com
- DerivaTrust
- eDeriv
- First Derivatives
- Integral Development Corp.
- trueEX LLC
- AEGIS Markets

== See also ==
- Central counterparty clearing
- Clearing house (finance)
- Swap (finance)
- International Swaps and Derivatives Association
- Credit derivatives
- Credit default swap
- Currency swap
- Forex swap
- Interest rate swap
- Energy derivative
- Multilateral trading facility
