= Financial instrument =

Monetary contract between parties

A financial instrument is a monetary contract between parties. They can be created, traded, modified and settled. They can be cash (currency), evidence of an ownership interest in an entity or a contractual right to receive or deliver in the form of currency (forex); debt (bonds, loans); equity (shares); or derivatives (options, futures, forwards).

International Accounting Standards IAS 32 and 39 define a financial instrument as "any contract that gives rise to a financial asset of one entity and a financial liability or equity instrument of another entity".

Financial instruments may be categorized by "asset class" depending on whether they are foreign exchange-based (reflecting foreign exchange instruments and transactions), equity-based (reflecting ownership of the issuing entity) or debt-based (reflecting a loan the investor has made to the issuing entity). If the instrument is debt it can be further categorized into short-term (less than one year) or long-term.

== Types ==
Financial instruments can be either cash instruments or derivative instruments:

- Cash instruments – instruments whose value is determined directly by the markets. They can be securities, which are readily transferable, and instruments such as loans and deposits, where both borrower and lender have to agree on a transfer.
- Derivative instruments – instruments which derive their value from the value and characteristics of one or more underlying entities such as an asset, index, or interest rate. They can be exchange-traded derivatives and over-the-counter (OTC) derivatives. Some of the more common derivatives include forwards, futures, options, swaps, and variations of these such as synthetic collateralized debt obligations and credit default swaps.

Asset class	Instrument type			
Asset class	Securities	Other cash	Exchange-traded derivatives	OTC derivatives
Debt (long term) 1 year	Bonds	Loans	Bond futures Options on bond futures	Interest rate swaps Interest rate caps and floors Interest rate options Exotic derivatives
Debt (short term) ≤ 1 year	Bills, e.g. T-bills; Commercial paper	Deposits; Certificates of deposit	Short-term interest rate futures	Forward rate agreements
Equity	Stock	N/A	Stock options Equity futures	Stock options Exotic derivatives
Foreign exchange	N/A	Spot foreign exchange	Currency futures	Foreign exchange options Outright forwards Foreign exchange swaps Currency swaps

Some instruments defy categorization into the above matrix, for example repurchase agreements.

== Measuring gain or loss ==
The gain or loss on a financial instrument is as follows:

Instrument Type	Categories	Measurement	Gains and losses
Assets	Loans and receivables	Amortized costs	Net income when asset is derecognized or impaired (foreign exchange and impairment recognized in net income immediately)
Assets	Available for sale financial assets	Deposit account – fair value	Other comprehensive income (impairment recognized in net income immediately)

== See also ==
- Off-balance-sheet issues
- IFRS 9 – Accounting standard titled "Financial Instruments"
- IFRS 7 – Accounting standard titled "Financial Instruments: Disclosures"
