= Multi-curve framework =

Mathematical finance concept

In mathematical finance, the multi-curve framework refers to the simultaneous use of multiple interest rate curves to price the various fixed income securities and derivatives, based on their characteristics, particularly tenor, but also currency.

== Context ==
Historically interest rate swaps, IRSs, were valued using discount factors derived from the same curve used to forecast the LIBOR (-IBOR) rates for payment (the erstwhile reference rates; see below re MRRs). This has been called "self-discounted". Following the 2008 financial crisis, however, it became apparent that the approach was not appropriate, and alignment towards discount factors associated with physical collateral of the IRSs was needed.

Thus, the now-standard pricing approach is the "multi-curve framework" where separate discount curves and forecast curves are built; here, respectively:

- Overnight index swap (OIS) rates are typically used to derive discount factors, since that index is the standard inclusion on Credit Support Annexes (CSAs) to determine the rate of interest payable on collateral for IRS contracts.
- As regards the payment / rates forecast, since the basis spread between LIBOR rates of different maturities widened during the crisis, forecast curves are generally constructed for each LIBOR tenor used in floating rate derivative legs.

== Curve construction ==
Although the Multi-curve framework modifies the overall approach, there is no change to the economic pricing principle: swap leg values are still identical at initiation, and, more generally, yield curves are consistent with the market prices of key (all) instruments (see Rational pricing § Swaps, and § Fixed-income securities). What differs is that, as above, separate curves are constructed for payments and for discounting.

Thus, regarding the curve build, the following emerges. Under the old framework a single self-discounted curve was "bootstrapped" for each tenor; i.e.: solved such that it exactly returned the observed prices of selected instruments—IRSs, with FRAs in the short end—with the build proceeding sequentially, date-wise, through these instruments. Under the new framework, the various curves are best fitted to observed market prices as a "curve set": one curve for discounting, and one for each IBOR-tenor "forecast curve"; the build is then based on quotes for IRSs and OISs, with FRAs included as before. Here, since the observed average overnight rate plus a spread is swapped for the -IBOR rate over the same period (the most liquid tenor in that market), and the -IBOR IRSs are in turn discounted on the OIS curve, the problem entails a nonlinear system, where all curve points are solved at once, and specialized iterative methods are usually employed (see further following). The forecast-curves for other tenors can be solved in a "second stage", bootstrap-style, with discounting on the now-solved OIS curve.

A CSA could allow for collateral, and hence interest payments on that collateral, in any currency. To accommodate this, banks include in their curve-set a USD discount-curve to be used for discounting local-IBOR trades which have USD collateral; this curve is sometimes called the (Dollar) "basis-curve". It is built by solving for observed (mark-to-market) cross-currency swap rates, where the local -IBOR is swapped for USD LIBOR with USD collateral as underpin. The latest, pre-solved USD-LIBOR-curve is therefore an (external) element of the curve-set, and the basis-curve is then solved in the "third stage". Each currency's curve-set will thus include a local-currency discount-curve and its USD discounting basis-curve. As required, a third-currency discount curve — i.e. for local trades collateralized in a currency other than local or USD (or any other combination) — can then be constructed from the local-currency basis-curve and third-currency basis-curve, combined via an arbitrage relationship known here as "FX Forward Invariance".

Various approaches to solving curves are possible. Modern methods tend to employ global optimizers with complete flexibility in the parameters that are solved relative to the calibrating instruments used to tune them. These optimizers will seek to minimize some objective function - here matching the observed instrument values - and this assumes that some interpolation mode has been configured for the curves; the approach ultimately employed may be a modification of Newton's method. Maturities corresponding to input instruments are referred to as "pillar points"; these are solved directly, while other spot rates are interpolated. (Then, once solved, all that need be stored are the pillar point rates and the interpolation rule.)

== Transition ==
Starting in 2021, LIBOR is being phased out, with replacements including other "market reference rates" (MRRs) such as SOFR and TONAR. (These MRRs are based on secured overnight funding transactions). With the coexistence of "old" and "new" rates in the market, multi-curve and OIS curve "management" is necessary, with changes required to incorporate new discounting and compounding conventions, while the underlying logic is unaffected; see.

== Other curves ==
The reference to "multi-curves" sometimes includes the various curves relating to credit quality. A notable post-crisis development is XVA, where CSA discount curves are combined with the counterparty's survival curve, and also with the relevant funding curves, so as to model the various "valuation adjustments" that may apply. Where the underlying-instrument exhibits optionality — caps and floors, swaptions, embedded derivatives — so a volatility "cube" will be further required. Relatedly, investment banks will sometimes value their bonds using CSA-linked discount curves, while adjusting the expected cashflows (coupons and "face") for default risk via the use of an issuer "credit curve".

== Risk management ==
The separation of discounting and forward curves, the explicit modeling of basis risk, and the incorporation of credit and volatility considerations all add layers of complexity as compared to the simpler self-discounting regime. Thus, financial risk management in a multi-curve environment involves a more nuanced approach to hedging, economic / risk capital, and stress testing. Since (individual) positions are (potentially) affected by numerous instruments not obviously related, a "real challenge" is to then hedge portfolios and describe risks coherently; hedge accounting is similarly complicated.

For stress testing, the bank must model the impact of the (macro-economic) scenario in question on the various (major) risk factors, incorporating, as far as possible, their interrelationships; under multi-curves, this (potentially) requires a modification to the existing framework. Similarly, to return an estimate of value at risk (VaR) the bank must now simulate changes in the OIS curve, forward curves, basis spreads, as well as credit spreads, while also ensuring that correlations between these risk factors are properly modeled. Allocation of the resultant economic capital — required, e.g., for RAROC calculations at the operational dealing "desk" level — is similarly complicated due to the multiple risk factors (and if required, partial sensitivities) involved.

== See also ==
- Yield curve § Construction of the full yield curve from market data
- Fixed-income attribution § Modeling the yield curve
