= International Bank for Reconstruction and Development =

Lending arm of the World Bank

Coordinates: 38.8990°N 77.0425°W

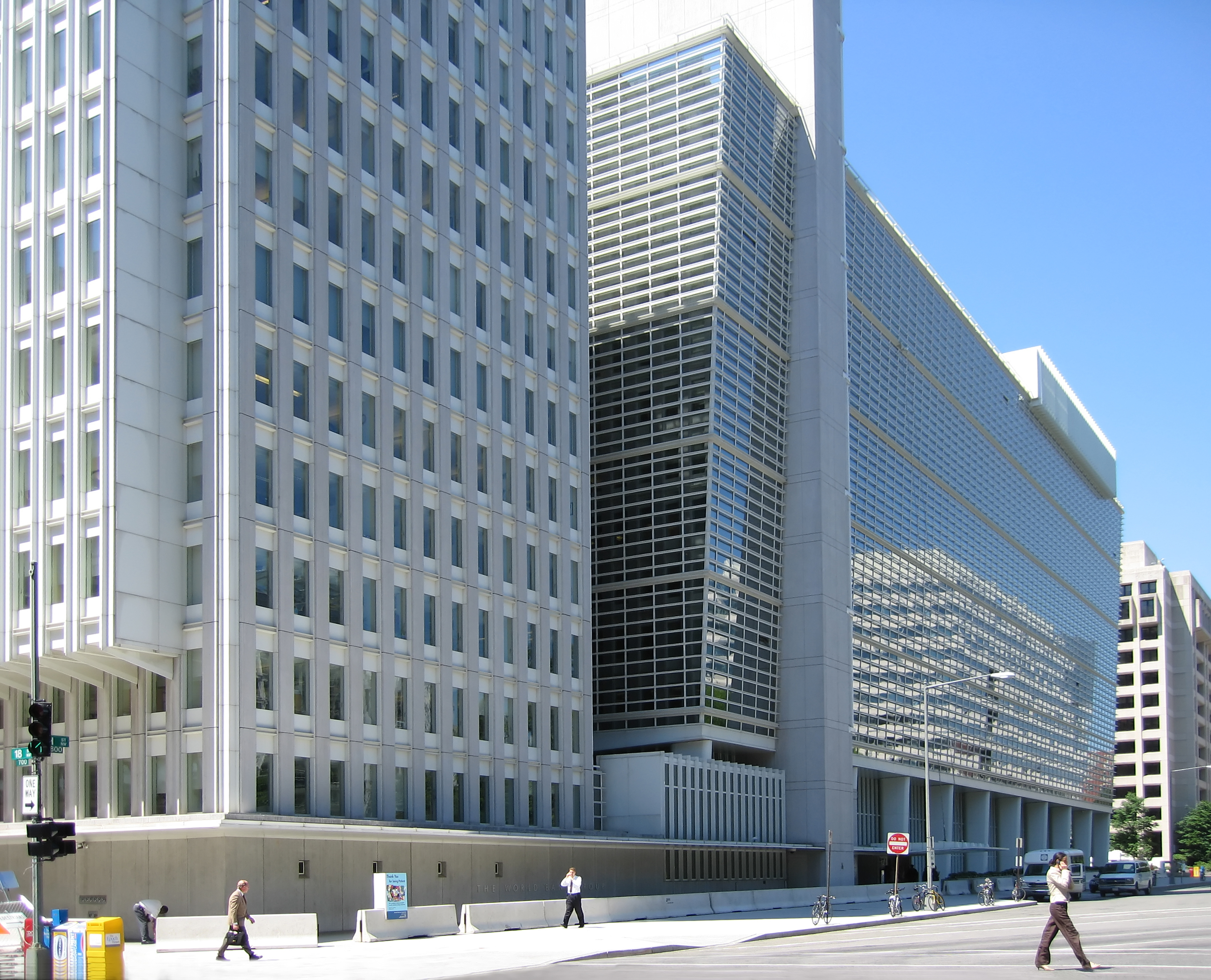
- Formation: 1944; 82 years ago
- Type: Development finance institution
- Legal status: Treaty
- Purpose: Development assistance, poverty reduction
- Headquarters: Washington, D.C., United States
- Members: 189 countries
- President of the World Bank: Ajay Banga
- Parent organization: World Bank Group
- Website: worldbank.org/ibrd

The International Bank for Reconstruction and Development (IBRD) is an international financial institution, established in 1944 and headquartered in Washington, D.C., United States; it is the lending arm of the World Bank Group. The IBRD offers loans to middle-income developing countries. It is the first of five member institutions that compose the World Bank Group. The initial mission of the IBRD in 1944, was to finance the reconstruction of European nations devastated by World War II. The IBRD and the concessional lending institution, the International Development Association (IDA), are collectively known as the World Bank as they share the same leadership and staff.

Following the reconstruction of Europe, the Bank's mandate expanded to advancing worldwide economic development and eradicating poverty. The IBRD provides commercial-grade or concessional financing to sovereign states to fund projects that seek to improve transportation and infrastructure, education, domestic policy, environmental consciousness, energy investments, healthcare, access to food and potable water, and access to improved sanitation.

The IBRD is owned and governed by its 189 member states, with each country represented on the Board of Governors. The IBRD has its executive leadership and staff which conduct its normal business operations. The Bank's member governments are shareholders which contribute and have the right to vote on its matters. In addition to contributions from its member nations, the IBRD acquires most of its capital by borrowing on international capital markets through bond issues at a preferred rate because of its AAA credit rating.

In 2011, it raised US$29 billion in capital from bond issues made in 26 different currencies. The Bank offers several financial services and products, including flexible loans, grants, risk guarantees, financial derivatives, and catastrophic risk financing. It reported lending commitments of $26.7 billion made to 132 projects in 2011.

== Governance ==
There are five "closely associated institutions" that each have a "distinct role" and together form the World Bank—the IBRD, the International Development Association (IDA), the International Finance Corporation (IFC), that "invests in private firms and promotes entrepreneurship", the Multilateral Investment Guarantee Agency (MIGA), that guarantees loans, and the International Centre for Settlement of Investment Disputes (ICSID). Their mission is to "fight poverty and improve living standards for people in the developing world." By 2018, the World Bank Group was "one of the world's largest sources of funding and knowledge for developing countries." Of the five institutions, the IBRD and the IDA are the World Bank's two largest units. When a country reaches a GDP per person over US$1,145, they are no longer eligible for IDA financial support. For example, of the BRIC countries, China was no longer eligible in 1999 and by 2014, neither was India.

The IBRD is governed by the World Bank's Board of Governors which meets annually and consists of one governor per member country (most often the country's finance minister or treasury secretary). The Board of Governors delegates most of its authority over daily matters such as lending and operations to the board of directors. The Board of Directors consists of 25 executive directors and is chaired by the President of the World Bank Group. The executive directors collectively represent all 189 member states of the World Bank. The president oversees the IBRD's overall direction and daily operations.

The Bank and IDA operate with a staff of approximately 10,000 employees.

On 9 April 2019, United States President Donald Trump nominated David Malpass as the World Bank Group's president. Malpass had served as one of President Trump's economic advisers and as a senior official in the United States Treasury Department. The IBRD member nations did not sponsor a "rival candidate" and Malpass became president, in spite of the fact that he is critical of the role of the IBRD.

== Background ==
The International Bank for Reconstruction and Development (IBRD) and International Monetary Fund (IMF) were established by delegates at the Bretton Woods Conference in 1944 and became operational in 1946. According to a March 2012 Washington Post article, IBRD was the "original 'world bank'".

IBRD field offices were opened in Paris, France, Copenhagen, Denmark, and Prague in the former Czechoslovakia.

The IBRD was established with the original mission of financing the reconstruction efforts of war-torn European nations following World War II, with goals shared by the later Marshall Plan. The Bank issued its inaugural loan of $250 million ($2.6 billion in 2 dollars) to France in 1947 to finance infrastructure projects.

In 1946, a few months after it became operational, Chile sought financial help from the IBRD—the first of the developing countries to do so.

Throughout the remainder of the 1940s and 1950s, the Bank-financed projects sought to dam rivers, generate electricity and improve access to water and sanitation. It also invested in France, Belgium, and Luxembourg's steel industry. Following the reconstruction of Europe, the Bank's mandate has transitioned to eradicating poverty around the world.

In 1960, the International Development Association (IDA) was established to serve as the Bank's concessional lending arm and provide low and no-cost finance and grants to the poorest of the developing countries as measured by gross national income per capita.

The IBRD is restricted in its borrowing, as it cannot provide loans in competition with private capital; IBRD loans have to be tied to specific projects; and the IBRD will normally only finance the direct foreign exchange costs of a project.

At the time of its creation, the IBRD was the only Multilateral Development Bank. During the period of decolonization—the mid‐1950s to the mid‐1970s—several MDBs were created—the International Finance Corporation, the International Development Association. They were both WBG members. During this period other MDBs that were similar to the IBRD in their governance and operations, were established by countries that were not member nations of the WBG. This included the Inter‐American Development Bank (IDB), the African Development Bank (AfDB), the Asian Development Bank (ADB), the Development Bank of Latin America and the Caribbean (CAF), and the Islamic Development Bank (IsDB). Both the CAF and IsDB are "primarily owned and controlled by borrower countries."

In the early 1990s, European nations established the European Bank of Reconstruction and Development (EBRD) and expanded European Investment Bank, to foster European integration and to assist post‐communist countries to transform their economies to become more market‐oriented.

By 2012, according to The Post, IBRD was using "its AAA credit rating to sell bonds at interest rates close to those of U.S. Treasury bonds." It loaned money to developing nations, such as China and Brazil.

According to the Global Policy, journal, While the IBRD and the IDA historically prioritized funding infrastructure projects, since the 1990s, the Bank has directed less lending to infrastructure projects in favour of other development projects such as fighting climate change, eradicating poverty and ensuring good governance.

== Financial model ==
The IBRD finances its activities from the shares its members hold, as well as borrowing on international capital markets by issuing World Bank bonds. The Bank raised US$54.0 billion worth of capital in fiscal 2019 from bonds issued in 27 different currencies.

Since 1959, the IBRD, which is backed by world governments has had a triple-A credit rating, which allows it to borrow capital at lower rates.

According to a 2015 article, commissioned by the Intergovernmental Group of Twenty-Four on International Monetary Affairs and Development—also known as the Group of 24 (G-24)—multilateral development banks (MDBs)—such as the IBRD—"represent one of the most successful types of international organization created in the post-World War II era." By October 2015, although the WBG—with its lending arms—was the only "global institution, there were more than twenty operational 20 MDBs in the world. In 2016, the Asian Infrastructure Investment Bank and BRICS New Development Bank began operations. Like other multilateral development banks, (MDBs), the IBRD has a preferred credit treatment (PCT), through which borrowers grant the MDBs a "privileged position to be first in line for repayment, should a country face financial restrictions."

The bank also generates income from the return on its equity and the small margins on the loans. As the IBRD does not seek profit, it transfers part of its excess income to the IDA ($259 million in fiscal 2019).

In 2011, the IBRD loaned about US$26 billion, which represented just a "fraction of the $72 billion the IMF approved as a credit line to a single nation, Mexico." In the early 2010s, the total of "capital investments in emerging markets from all sources have topped $1 trillion annually". According to the Institute of International Finance, in 2011, the "combined net investment of the World Bank and other international development banks and agencies" was about $20 billion in 2011.

According to a 2019 The Economist article, the IBRD is "more controversial" than the International Development Association (IDA) lending arm. With its AAA credit rating, the IBRD can "borrow money cheaply on the international financial markets". Middle-income countries, like Brazil and China, that currently borrow from the IBRD, could "borrow in abundance from foreign investors" on their own.

== Services ==
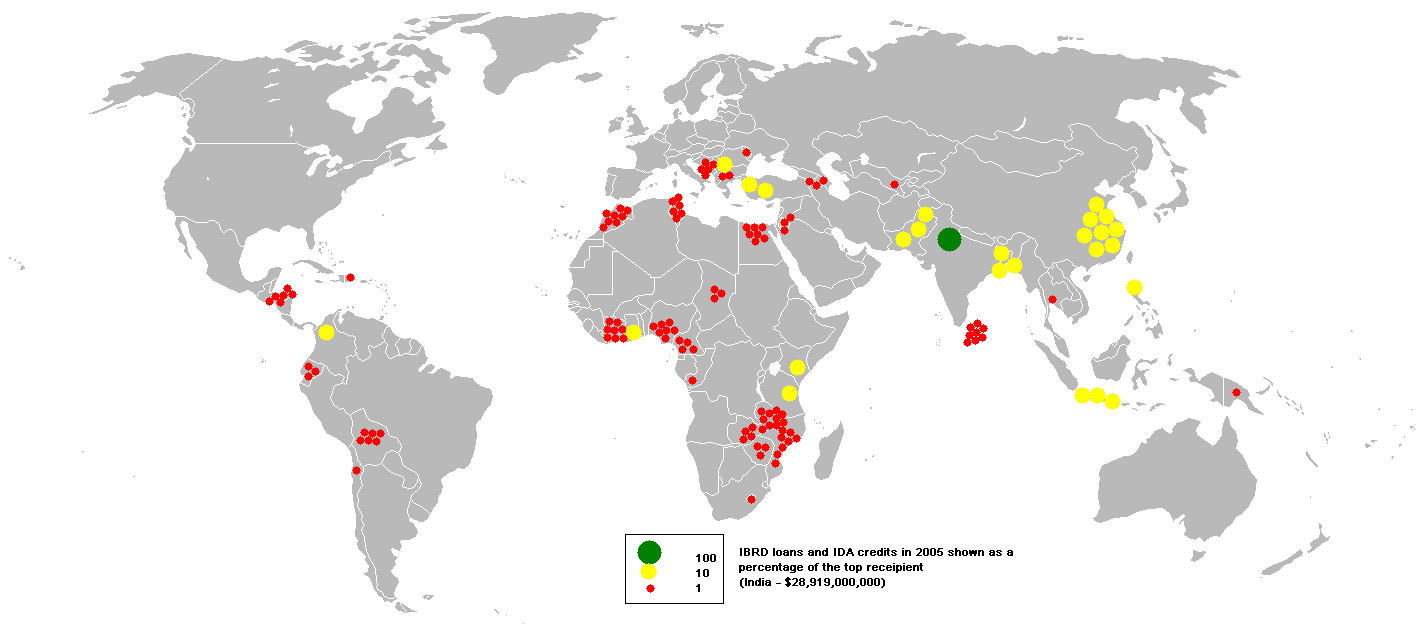
IBRD loans and IDA credits in 2005

The IBRD provides financial services as well as strategic coordination and information services to its borrowing member countries. The Bank only finances sovereign governments directly, or projects backed by sovereign governments. The World Bank Treasury is the division of the IBRD that manages the Bank's debt portfolio of over $100 billion and financial derivatives transactions of $20 billion.

The Bank offers flexible loans with maturities as long as 30 years and custom-tailored repayment scheduling. The IBRD also offers loans in local currencies. Through a joint effort between the IBRD and the International Finance Corporation, the Bank offers financing to subnational entities either with or without sovereign guarantees. For borrowers needing quick financing for an unexpected change, the IBRD operates a Deferred Drawdown Option which serves as a line of credit with features similar to the Bank's flexible loan program. Among the World Bank Group's credit enhancement and guarantee products, the IBRD offers policy-based guarantees to cover countries' sovereign default risk, partial credit guarantees to cover the credit risk of a sovereign government or subnational entity, and partial risk guarantees to private projects to cover a government's failure to meet its contractual obligations. The IBRD's Enclave Partial Risk Guarantee covers private projects in member countries of the IDA against sovereign governments' failures to fulfil contractual obligations. The Bank provides an array of financial risk management products including foreign exchange swaps, currency conversions, interest rate swaps, interest rate caps and floors, and commodity swaps. To help borrowers protect against catastrophes and other special risks, the bank offers a Catastrophe Deferred Drawdown Option to provide financing after a natural disaster or declared state of emergency. It also issues catastrophe bonds which transfer catastrophic risks from borrowers to investors. The IBRD reported $23.2 billion in lending commitments for 100 projects in fiscal year 2019. The top 10 borrowers were India, Indonesia, Jordan, Egypt, Argentina, China, Morocco, Turkey, Ukraine and Colombia. The most supported sector was Public Administration.

== See also ==
- Bretton Woods system
