= MIBOR (Indian reference rate) =

Indian inter-bank daily reference rate

The Mumbai Interbank Outright Rate (MIBOR) is the overnight interest rate or reference rate based on the averaged interest rates at which Indian banks borrow unsecured funds from counterparties in the Indian rupee wholesale money market (or interbank market). The rate was originally published by the Fixed Income Money Market and Derivative Association of India (FIMMDA) and the National Stock Exchange of India (NSE). This was moved to a dedicated organisation, Financial Benchmarks India Private Ltd (FBIL) in 2015 which is jointly owned by FIMMDA, the Foreign Exchange Dealers’ Association of India (FEDAI) and the Indian Banks' Association (IBA). The rate is based on similar rates in London such as Libor and Euribor.

The MIBOR is used as a bench mark rate for majority of financial derivative deals struck for interest rate swaps, forward rate agreements, Floating Rate Debentures and term deposits in India. The rate is fixed on the basis of volume based weighted average of traded rates from 9 am to 10 am each morning.

== History ==
In the mid 1990s, the Committee for the Development of the Debt Market had studied and recommended the development of a benchmark rate for the call money markets in India. Accordingly, National Stock Exchange of India (NSE) developed and launched the NSE Mumbai Inter-Bank Bid Rate (MIBID) and NSE Mumbai Inter-bank Offer Rate (MIBOR) for the overnight money market on June 15, 1998. The success of the Overnight NSE MIBID MIBOR encouraged the Exchange to develop a benchmark rate for the term money market. NSE launched the 14-day NSE MIBID MIBOR on November 10, 1998, and the longer term money market benchmark rates for 1 month and 3 months on December 1, 1998. Further, the exchange introduced a 3 Day FIMMDA-NSE MIBID-MIBOR on all Fridays with effect from June 6, 2008, in addition to existing overnight rate.

Fixed Income Money Market and Derivative Association of India (FIMMDA) has been in the forefront for creation of benchmarks that can be used by the market participants to bring uniformity in the market place. To take the process of development further, FIMMDA and NSE have taken the initiative to co-brand the dissemination of reference rates for the Overnight Call and Term Money Market using the current methodology behind NSE – MIBID/MIBOR. The product was rechristened as 'FIMMDA-NSE MIBID/MIBOR'. The 'FIMMDA-NSE MIBID/MIBOR' is now jointly disseminated by FIMMDA as well as NSEIL through their websites and other means and simultaneous dissemination of the information would be as per international practice.

== See also ==
- Euribor
- TIBOR
- Prime rate
- TED spread
- Libor-OIS spread
- LIBID
- MIBOR (disambiguation)
