= TrueEX Group =

trueEX Group LLC
- Company type: Private; Limited Liability Company
- Industry: Designated Contract Market (DCM)
- Founded: October 21, 2010; Delaware
- Headquarters: New York, NY, United States
- Key people: Sunil Hirani, Founder and CEO James R. Miller, Co-Founder
- Products: Electronic exchange for interest rate swaps
- Website: http://www.trueex.com/

trueEX Group LLC, known as trueEX, is a New York-based financial technology company established as an electronic exchange platform for global interest rate swaps (IRS).

It was founded on October 21, 2010, by Sunil G. Hirani, a co-founder of Creditex Group Inc, and Jim Miller. trueEX is organized as a Delaware limited liability company and is a wholly owned subsidiary of trueEX Group. Its headquarters are in the Flatiron District of New York City.

On September 28, 2012, trueEX became the first electronic swaps exchange to receive approval by the U.S. Commodity Futures Trading Commission (CFTC) as a Dodd-Frank compliant Designated Contract Market (DCM). trueEX was created in response to the Dodd-Frank Wall Street Reform and Consumer Protection Act, which imposed new regulations and standards on financial markets following the 2008 financial crisis. The company intended to trade interest rate swaps and other liquid derivatives, and is the first to provide back loading, termination, re-balancing and compaction services for the interest rate swaps market.

In the first year of operation, trueEX onboarded 11 clearing houses, 14 dealers, and 63 buy-side firms. trueEX has executed over $2.7 trillion in PTC, RFQ, Compressions, and Post Trade Services for the buy-side and dealer community.

trueEX ended trading operations on July 19, 2019.
