= FIDC =

FIDC may refer to:

- Falkland Islands Development Corporation, Falkland Islands quasi-autonomous government agency
- Fundo de Investimento em Direitos Creditórios, Brazilian financial instrument
