= QSD =

QSD may refer to:

- Q code, "Is my keying defective?" / "Are my signals mutilated?"
- Quality spread differential, a concept in finance
- Quadrilateral Security Dialogue, a strategic dialogue
- Quick Step–Davitamon, UCI cycling team (2003–04)
- Syrian Democratic Forces (Quwwāt Sūriyā al-Dīmuqrāṭīya)
