= Constant maturity swap =

Type of swap in finance

A constant maturity swap (CMS) is a swap that allows the purchaser to fix the duration of received flows on a swap.

The floating leg of an interest rate swap typically resets against a published index. The floating leg of a constant maturity swap fixes against a point on the swap curve on a periodic basis.

A constant maturity swap is an interest rate swap where the interest rate on one leg is reset periodically, but with reference to a market swap rate rather than LIBOR. The other leg of the swap is generally LIBOR, but may be a fixed rate or potentially another constant maturity rate. Constant maturity swaps can either be single currency or cross currency swaps. Therefore, the prime factor for a constant maturity swap is the shape of the forward implied yield curves. A single currency constant maturity swap versus LIBOR is similar to a series of differential interest rate fixes (or "DIRF") in the same way that an interest rate swap is similar to a series of forward rate agreements. Valuation of constant maturity swaps depend on volatilities of different forward rates and therefore requires a stochastic yield curve model or some approximated methodology like a convexity adjustment, see for example Brigo and Mercurio (2006).

== Example ==
A customer believes that the six-month LIBOR rate will fall relative to the three-year swap rate for a given currency. To take advantage of this curve steepening, he buys a constant maturity swap paying the six-month LIBOR rate and receiving the three-year swap rate.
