= Amortising swap =

Type of financial transaction

An Amortising swap is an interest rate swap in which the notional principal for the interest payments declines (i.e. is paid down) during the life of the swap, perhaps at a rate tied to the prepayment of a mortgage or to an interest rate benchmark such as the London Interbank Offered Rate (Libor). It is the opposite of the accreting swap. If the swap allows for uncertain contingent ups and downs in the notional principal, it is called a "roller-coaster swap".

== Use in hedging ==
Amortising swaps are used to hedge exposures whose principal amount declines over time. The International Swaps and Derivatives Association (ISDA) notes that variable notional swaps, also known as amortizing swaps, are used by some market participants to hedge non-standard risks.

ISDA also describes non-standard swaps as including structures in which the notional amount changes over the life of the contract, which makes amortising swaps suitable for exposures that decline over time rather than remain fixed.
