= Fundo de Investimento em Direitos Creditórios =

Fundo de Investimento em Direitos Creditórios (FIDC) is a financial instrument widely used in Brazilian credit markets and has been frequently traded by international investors and hedge funds.

A FIDC is a type of fund composed of receivables (direitos creditórios) from different types of issuers. Brazilian banks often lend to individuals or companies, package these receivables into an FIDC fund, and sell them to the public.

Many of these funds are created with asset tranches. The bank keeps the equity tranche, or the first defaults. As a result, the credit rating of the FIDC is better than that of the original loan.

The majority of FIDCs in the market today come from loans to public and private pension beneficiaries (guaranteed by the pension plans) and real estate receivables; credit card receivables are less common.

== Sources ==
Moodys International Credit Agency

The Brazilian Securitization Market: A Primer - Special Report
