= Smith–Wilson method =

The Smith–Wilson method is a method for extrapolating forward rates. It was introduced in 2000 by A. Smith and T. Wilson for Bacon & Woodrow.

== Mathematical formulation ==
Let UFR be some ultimate forward rate and $u_i$ be the time to the i'th maturity. Then $P(t)$ defines the price of a zero-coupon bond at time t.

$P(t) = e^{-UFR\cdot t} + \sum_{j=1}^N \xi_j \cdot W(t, u_j)$

Where $W(t, u_j) = e^{-UFR\cdot (t+u_j)} \cdot (\alpha\cdot \min(t, u_j) - 0.5e^{-\alpha\cdot \max(t, u_j)}\cdot (e^{\alpha\cdot \min(t, u_j)} - e^{-\alpha\cdot \min(t, u_j)}))$

and the symmetric W matrix is $W = (W(u_i, u_j))_{i=1,...,N:j=1,...,N}$

and $p = (P(u_1), ..., P(u_N))^T$, $\mu = (e^{-UFR\cdot u_1}, ..., e^{-UFR\cdot u_N})^T$, $\xi = W^{-1}(p-\mu)$.
