= Swap spread =

Financial metric

Swap spreads are the difference between the yield on a government bond or sovereign debt security and the fixed component of a swap, both of which have a similar time until maturity. Given that most sovereign debt securities such as government bonds are considered to be risk free securities the role of a swap spread is to reflect the risk levels of an agreement perceived by the investors involved. Swap spreads are therefore categorised to be an economic indication tool as the size of the swap spread reflects the level of risk aversion within the financial markets. Swap spreads is a term coined by economists to generate a tool to assess current market conditions. Swap spreads have become more popular as a metric of financial forecasting and measurement as a result of their increased correlation to financial market activity and volatility. Used as an indicator of economic activity, higher swap spreads are indicative of greater risk aversion within the market place. Governments, financial markets and policy makers in general therefore utilise this metric to make decisions as it is argued to reflect market sentiment.

== History ==
The term swap spreads was introduced as a result of the creation of credit default swaps (CDOs) by investment bank JP Morgan in 1994. CDOs generated the fundamentals of swap spreads which are now deployed to analyse a variety of core market indicators and conditions. The notional amounts of CDS’s have declined, however the structural model has been used continually to examine both firm specific and market determinants of swap spreads. Multifactor analysis of both firm specific and market specific are aggregated in the economy current to determine the swap spread size.

== Finance ==
The use of the term swap-spreads in financial markets has grown progressively over time. Many economists have deconstructed swap spreads and their implications on the financial markets in order to make investment decisions within the global equity and fixed income markets. The utilization of swap spreads as a tool within the markets has grown substantially since 1994 due to the growing understanding of the interrelationship between financial themes. A swap spread is the difference between the fixed component of a given swap and the yield of a debt security. In the US this correlation triggered the emergence of derivative products and contracts as investors looked to exchange fixed interest repayments on their securities for floating rate repayments. Swap spreads as a result emerged as a mechanism to price this transition from fixed to floating rate repayments.

== Mechanics ==
Swap spreads have been adopted into the pricing metrics by many financial institutions when they look to assess the value of their assets under management and future business opportunities. At the base level, swap spreads are contracts which allow people to manage their risk in which two parties agree to exchange cash flows between a fixed and floating rate holding. Simply, the swap spread rate = swap rate – yield on a government bond. The computation of a swap spread has evolved over time as financial market participants look to use the data to make either short or long decisions within the financial markets.

== Computation ==
The equation for a Swap Rate Spread is swap rate – Yield on Government Bond.
This can be computed as the following :. If a 10-year swap has a fixed rate of 4% and a 10-year Treasury note (T-note) with the same maturity date has a fixed rate of 3%, the swap spread would be 1% or 100 basis points: 4% - 3% = 1%. Swap spreads have been used as a strategy by firms to arbitrage the market and generate a profit on their balance sheet positions. A long swap trade will be profitable when spreads across the instrument of interest widen. This is executed within the market by a counterparty lending out an security and receiving cash from a financial intermediary. The financial intermediary will then lend out that security to another counterparty or market participator where it will pay a fixed level of interest however receive floating interest repayments. Therefore if spreads widen, or interest rates rise they will have higher levels of interest received in comparison to what is being paid. A swap spread short can also generate profits, this will occur in an environment when swap spreads narrow. In order for financial market participants to generate profits off this movement in the market they must undertake the opposite execution as outlined earlier. During modern trading environments profitability is also evident when swap spreads become negative. This phenomenon had not been observed prior to 2008. Interestingly, the overall financial market efficiency and increase in algorithmic trading has limited the level of market arbitrage as spreads have flattened across all instruments. A spread flattening and more specifically a swap-spread tightening and tightening of the bid-ask spread identifies efficiency within this market.

== Interest rate swap ==
An interest rate swap is a market estimation of where a typical three-month or six-month bank bill swap rate will be on average over the elected time horizon. The six or three month bank bill swap rate is in the cost for banks to borrow money over these shorter maturities. The subsequent spread or difference between the bank bill swap rate (BBSW) and the markets estimation on where the national cash rate will sit over the same time horizon is known informally as the Bills spread.

== Negative swap spreads ==
Negative swap spreads are a new phenomenon occurring in the market. Beginning in 2008 the commonly referenced swap spread on the 30-year swap T-bonds turned negative and has remained so since. The swap spread on the 10 year T-bonds also turned negative during 2015 in response to the Chinese government selling US treasuries. Negative swap spreads are difficult for traditional asset pricing models to utilise as they imply a risk free arbitrage opportunity. The development of the financial markets has propelled market efficiency and during a limited arbitrage environment negative swap spreads are not uncommon. Therefore negative swap spreads are indicative of market development and efficiency. A negative swap spread also is an indicator of a market arbitrage opportunity however in order to capitalise on this opportunity market participants must assume exposure to the repo market. For market participants broadly, those who do not undertake a market arbitrage strategy an inversion in swap spreads suggests that overall market upside is limited. Upside however resumed once the swap spread normalises. Swap Spread as an economic indicator Given that swap spreads require an understanding of basic arithmetic they have been labelled as complex financial products which quantify the difference between yields in on government bonds and interest rate swaps on similar securities. During periods of sustained economic volatility swap spread markets move violently as financial institutions slash rates to contain economic fallout. Spreads widen, volumes surge and prices fluctuate substantially during periods of economic stress evdent in the 2008 GFC and Covid 19 economic meltdown in March 2020.

== Utilization ==
Swap spreads are an indicator of the markets desire to hedge risk, the cost of that risk and the overall level of liquidity within the market in terms of participators ability and willingness to buy financial instruments. Firm performance and macroeconomic stability can be derived from the movements in swap spreads. Therefore businesses and policy makers utilise swap spreads when generating economic activity forecasts and organisational P&L models. A blow out in swap spreads has indicated financial distress and general fear of amongst the markets, whereas swap spreads which are tightening may indicate economic stability and overall market prosperity.

== Limitations ==
Negative swap spreads can be a sign of dysfunction in the interest-rate derivatives market. The influence of fundamental changes in the structure of capital markets which have occurred due to post crisis banking regulation is relatively unknown in regards to its influence on swap spread products. The use of swap spreads in broken financial markets is challenged as there is often an observed incoherent relationship to the movements in the financial products and the activity within the market.

The product often lag and their recovery is divergent across markets. Developing markets see swap spreads returning to normal rapidly after financial crisis however in developing financial markets this process takes much longer.

== Potential developments ==
The advent of electronic trading platforms such as TradeWeb, Bloomberg, YieldBroker and Reuters is beginning to change the behaviour of swap spreads. The rise of the electronic market is enabling expeditious processing of transactions and the development of algorithms to execute transactions globally. Artificially intelligent systems are also acting as digital market makers which is increasing the volatility of swap spreads and their pace of change within the markets. The growth in algorithmic trading increasing the velocity in swap spread movement is amplified by the growth in passive ETFs and the increase in passive trading styles which aim to execute a large number of transactions across portfolios which comprise thousands of positions. This surge in transaction scale has been enabled by machines as humans have not been able to execute transactions of this magnitude in the past. The surge in transactional quantity has triggered bond scarcity across the markets which is largely influential on swap spread movements. Therefore the relationship between swap spreads and bond quantity available within the markets has grown.

== Variation across economies ==
There is observable variance in swap spreads between economies. This has been explained by variables which are the core fundamentals of what is used to price and determine the swap spreads within a given economy. The cost of repo financing, the price of bank credit or bank bonds, the gross issuance of bonds, that is the new supply of bonds within the market and the central bank within the specified economies share of the nominal bond market all determine the swap spread. Covid-19 has presented unique patterns in the performance of swap spreads as artificial fiscal supply of money and market arbitrage by algorithmic trading platforms have generated unusual outcomes such as negative swap spreads. The 10 year swap spread has been observed to trade through or below economies 10 year bonds such as the treasuries in the United States. This has been argued to be a result of governments issuing substantial supply of government debt to fund their growing fiscal deficits incurred due to covid-19 related expenditure. The performance of an economies stock market is also influential on swap spreads and vice versa. The stock market within an economy is unable to perform when swap spreads are negative or trading through the government bonds. A normalisation of swap spreads to be positive is seen as a signal of a resumption to the long standing bull stock market trend.
