= Interest rate option =

Financial derivative contract

An interest rate option is a specific financial derivative contract whose value is based on interest rates. Its value is tied to an underlying interest rate, such as the yield on 10 year treasury notes.

Similar to equity options, there are two types of contracts: calls and puts. A call gives the bearer the right, but not the obligation, to benefit off a rise in interest rates. A put gives the bearer the right, but not the obligation, to profit from a decrease in interest rates.

The exchange of these interest rate derivatives are monitored and facilitated by a central exchange such as those operated by CME Group.

== See also ==
- Derivative (finance)
