= Forward-forward agreement =

Forward rate agreement

In business and contract law, a forward-forward agreement (FFA) is a form of forward rate agreement in which party A agrees to lend party B the m_{1} amount of money, at future time t_{1}. In return, B will pay to A a larger monetary amount m_{2} at time t_{2} > t_{1}. The name "forward-forward agreement" derives from the fact that both issuing and repayment of the loan take place in the future. A regular forward rate agreement lends the money at once. A quoted forward rate is associated with every forward-forward agreement. This can be thought of as the interest rate earned by party A for lending the money to B.

== See also ==
- Futures contract
- Forward contract
- Arbitrage
