= MIBOR =

MIBOR may refer to:

- MIBOR (Mumbai Inter-Bank Offer Rate)
- MIBOR (Moscow Inter-Bank Offer Rate)
- MIBOR (Madrid Inter-Bank Offer Rate)
