= Equity swap =

Type of financial derivative contract

An equity swap is a financial derivative contract (a swap) where a set of future cash flows are agreed to be exchanged between two counterparties at set dates in the future. The two cash flows are usually referred to as "legs" of the swap; one of these "legs" is usually pegged to a floating rate such as LIBOR. This leg is also commonly referred to as the "floating leg". The other leg of the swap is based on the performance of either a share of stock or a stock market index. This leg is commonly referred to as the "equity leg". Most equity swaps involve a floating leg vs. an equity leg, although some exist with two equity legs.

An equity swap involves a notional principal, a specified duration and predetermined payment intervals.

Equity swaps are typically traded by delta one trading desks.

== Applications ==
Typically equity swaps are entered into in order to avoid transaction costs (including Tax), to avoid locally based dividend taxes, limitations on leverage (notably the US margin regime) or to get around rules governing the particular type of investment that an institution can hold.

Equity swaps also provide the following benefits over plain vanilla equity investing:

- An investor in a physical holding of shares loses possession on the shares once he sells his position. However, using an equity swap the investor can pass on the negative returns on equity position without losing the possession of the shares and hence voting rights.

For example, let's say A holds 100 shares of a Petroleum Company. As the price of crude falls the investor believes the stock would start giving him negative returns in the short run. However, his holding gives him a strategic voting right in the board which he does not want to lose. Hence, he enters into an equity swap deal wherein he agrees to pay Party B the return on his shares against LIBOR+25bps on a notional amt. If A is proven right, he will get money from B on account of the negative return on the stock as well as LIBOR+25bps on the notional. Hence, he mitigates the negative returns on the stock without losing on voting rights.

- It allows an investor to receive the return on a security which is listed in such a market where he cannot invest due to legal issues.

For example, let's say A wants to invest in company X listed in Country C. However, A is not allowed to invest in Country C due to capital control regulations. He can however, enter into a contract with B, who is a resident of C, and ask him to buy the shares of company X and provide him with the return on share X and he agrees to pay him a fixed / floating rate of return.

Equity swaps, if effectively used, can make investment barriers vanish and help an investor create leverage similar to those seen in derivative products. However a clearing house is needed to settle the contract in a neutral location to offset counterparty risk.

Investment banks that offer this product usually take a riskless position by hedging the client's position with the underlying asset. For example, the client may trade a swap – say Vodafone. The bank credits the client with 1,000 Vodafone at GBP1.45. The bank pays the return on this investment to the client, but also buys the stock in the same quantity for its own trading book (1,000 Vodafone at GBP1.45). Any equity-leg return paid to or due from the client is offset against realised profit or loss on its own investment in the underlying asset. The bank makes its money through commissions, interest spreads and dividend rake-off (paying the client less of the dividend than it receives itself). It may also use the hedge position stock (1,000 Vodafone in this example) as part of a funding transaction such as stock lending, repo or as collateral for a loan.

== Examples ==
Parties may agree to make periodic payments or a single payment at the maturity of the swap ("bullet" swap).

Take a simple index swap where Party A swaps £5,000,000 at LIBOR + 0.03% (also called LIBOR + 3 basis points) against £5,000,000 (FTSE to the £5,000,000 notional).

In this case Party A will pay (to Party B) a floating interest rate (LIBOR +0.03%) on the £5,000,000 notional and would receive from Party B any percentage increase in the FTSE equity index applied to the £5,000,000 notional.

In this example, assuming a LIBOR rate of 5.97% p.a. and a swap tenor of precisely 180 days, the floating leg payer/equity receiver (Party A) would owe (5.97%+0.03%)*£5,000,000*180/360 = £150,000 to the equity payer/floating leg receiver (Party B).

At the same date (after 180 days) if the FTSE had appreciated by 10% from its level at trade commencement, Party B would owe 10%*£5,000,000 = £500,000 to Party A. If, on the other hand, the FTSE at the six-month mark had fallen by 10% from its level at trade commencement, Party A would owe an additional 10%*£5,000,000 = £500,000 to Party B, since the flow is negative.

For mitigating credit exposure, the trade can be reset, or "marked-to-market" during its life. In that case, appreciation or depreciation since the last reset is paid and the notional is increased by any payment to the floating leg payer (pricing rate receiver) or decreased by any payment from the floating leg payer (pricing rate receiver).

Equity swaps have many applications. For example, a portfolio manager with XYZ Fund can swap the fund's returns for the returns of the S&P 500 (capital gains, dividends and income distributions). They most often occur when a manager of a fixed income portfolio wants the portfolio to have exposure to the equity markets either as a hedge or a position. The portfolio manager would enter into a swap in which he would receive the return of the S&P 500 and pay the counterparty a fixed rate generated from his portfolio. The payment the manager receives will be equal to the amount he is receiving in fixed-income payments, so the manager's net exposure is solely to the S&P 500 (and risk that the counterparty defaults). These types of swaps are usually inexpensive and require little in terms of administration.

== See also ==
- Collateral contract
