= Quality spread differential =

Quality spread differential (QSD) arises during an interest rate swap in which two parties of different levels of creditworthiness experience different levels of interest rates of debt obligations. A positive QSD means that a swap is in the interest of both parties. A QSD is the difference between the default-risk premium differential on the fixed- rate debt and the default-risk premium differential on the floating-rate debt. In general, the former is greater than the latter.

== Example ==
If Company A can borrow at a fixed rate of 12% or at LIBOR+2%, while Company B can borrow at a fixed rate of 10% or at LIBOR+1%, then there is a difference of 2% in fixed rate borrowings, but of only 1% in floating rate borrowings. A difference of 1% therefore exists as the QSD, and a swap would benefit both parties. The benefits are experienced as, although Company B has an absolute advantage over Company A, Company A has a comparative advantage at floating borrowing.

Assuming Company A and Company B are willing to split the arbitrage profits equally, Company A would borrow $1,000,000 at a rate of LIBOR + 2% from the debt markets, while Company B would borrow $1,000,000 at a rate of 10% from the debt markets. Company A would further agree to enter a swap where it pays Company B 9.5% on $1,000,000 in exchange for Company B paying Company A the LIBOR rate on $1,000,000.

Company A would owe the debt markets LIBOR + 2%, and owe Company B 9.5%, but would receive LIBOR from Company B. On net, Company A would now owe a total of 11.5%, which is lower than the 12% fixed rate at which it could have originally borrowed.

Company B would owe the debt markets 10%, and owe Company A LIBOR, but would receive 9.5% from Company A. On net, Company B would owe LIBOR + 0.5%, which is lower than LIBOR + 1% floating rate at which it could have originally borrowed.

Therefore, both parties are able to benefit from entering into a swap with the other.
