= Repricing risk =

Repricing risk is the risk of changes in interest rate charged (earned) at the time a financial contract’s rate is reset. It emerges if interest rates are settled on liabilities for periods which differ from those on offsetting assets. Repricing risk also refers to the probability that the yield curve will move in a way that influence by the values of securities tied to interest rates -- especially, bonds and market securities.

== Review on repricing risk ==
Repricing risk is presented by assets and liabilities that reprice at different times and rates. The changes in interest rate either impacts on the asset returns or the liability costs. Repricing risks arise from timing differences in the maturity for fixed-rate and repricing for floating-rate bank assets, liabilities and off-balance-sheet positions. Any instance of an interest rate being reset—either due to maturities or floating interest rate resets—is called a repricing. The date on which it occurs is called the repricing date.

One reason may be maturity mismatches. For instance, suppose a company is earning 5% on an asset supporting a liability on which it is paying 3.5%. The asset matures in three years while the liability matures in ten. In three years, the firm will have to reinvest the proceeds from the asset. If interest rates decrease, it could end up reinvesting at 3%. For the remaining seven years, it would earn 3% on the new asset while continuing to pay 3.5% on the original liability. Repricing risk also occurs with floating rate assets or liabilities. If fixed rate assets are financed with floating rate liabilities, the rate payable on the liabilities may rise while the rate earned on the assets remains constant.

If a portfolio has assets repricing earlier than liabilities, it is said to be asset sensitive. This is because recent changes in earnings are driven by interest rate resets on those assets. Similarly, if liabilities reprice earlier, earnings are more exposed to interest rate resets on those liability, and the portfolio is called liability sensitive.

== Repricing price effect ==
Repricing risk reflects the possibility that assets and liabilities will be repriced at different times or amounts and affect an institution’s earnings, capital, or general financial condition in a negative way. For example, the management may use non-maturity deposits to fund long-term, fixed-rate securities. If deposit rates increase, the higher funding costs would likely reduce net yields on fixed-rate securities.

The repricing gap is a measure of the difference between the dollar value of assets that will reprice and the dollar value of liabilities that will reprice within a specific time period, where reprice means the potential to receive a new interest rate. Rate sensitivity represents the time interval where repricing can occur. Rate-sensitive assets are those assets that will mature or reprice in a given time period. Rate-sensitive liabilities are those liabilities that will mature or reprice in a given time period.

The repricing model focuses on the potential changes in the net interest income variable. In effect, if interest rates change, interest income and interest expense will change as the various assets and liabilities are repriced, that is, receive new interest rates. There are two advantages of repricing model. First, it is easily to be understood. And it works well with small changes in interest rates. One of its disadvantages is it ignores market value effects and off-balance sheet cash flows. Next, it is over-aggregative, which distribution of assets and liabilities within individual buckets is not considered. Mismatches within buckets can be substantial. Besides that, it ignores the effects of runoffs.

== See also ==
- Interest rate risk
- Credit risk
- Financial risk
- Fixed Interest
