= Convexity (finance) =

Concept in mathematical finance

In mathematical finance, convexity refers to non-linearities in a financial model. In other words, if the price of an underlying variable changes, the price of an output does not change linearly, but depends on the second derivative (or, loosely speaking, higher-order terms) of the modeling function. Geometrically, the model is no longer flat but curved, and the degree of curvature is called the convexity.

== Terminology ==
Strictly speaking, convexity refers to the second derivative of output price with respect to an input price. In derivative pricing, this is referred to as Gamma (Γ), one of the Greeks. In practice the most significant of these is bond convexity, the second derivative of bond price with respect to interest rates.

As the second derivative is the first non-linear term, and thus often the most significant, "convexity" is also used loosely to refer to non-linearities generally, including higher-order terms. Refining a model to account for non-linearities is referred to as a convexity correction.

== Mathematics ==
Formally, the convexity adjustment arises from the Jensen inequality in probability theory: the expected value of a convex function is greater than or equal to the function of the expected value:

$$E[f(X)] \geq f(E[X]).$$

Geometrically, if the model price curves up on both sides of the present value (the payoff function is convex up, and is above a tangent line at that point), then if the price of the underlying changes, the price of the output is greater than is modeled using only the first derivative. Conversely, if the model price curves down (the convexity is negative, the payoff function is below the tangent line), the price of the output is lower than is modeled using only the first derivative.

The precise convexity adjustment depends on the model of future price movements of the underlying (the probability distribution) and on the model of the price, though it is linear in the convexity (second derivative of the price function).

== Interpretation ==
The convexity can be used to interpret derivative pricing: mathematically, convexity is optionality – the price of an option (the value of optionality) corresponds to the convexity of the underlying payout.

In Black–Scholes pricing of options, omitting interest rates and the first derivative, the Black–Scholes equation reduces to $\Theta = -\Gamma,$ "(infinitesimally) the time value is the convexity". That is, the value of an option is due to the convexity of the ultimate payout: one has the option to buy an asset or not (in a call; for a put it is an option to sell), and the ultimate payout function (a hockey stick shape) is convex – "optionality" corresponds to convexity in the payout. Thus, if one purchases a call option, the expected value of the option is higher than simply taking the expected future value of the underlying and inputting it into the option payout function: the expected value of a convex function is higher than the function of the expected value (Jensen inequality). The price of the option – the value of the optionality – thus reflects the convexity of the payoff function.

This value is isolated via a straddle – purchasing an at-the-money straddle (whose value increases if the price of the underlying increases or decreases) has (initially) no delta: one is simply purchasing convexity (optionality), without taking a position on the underlying asset – one benefits from the degree of movement, not the direction.

From the point of view of risk management, being long convexity (having positive Gamma and hence (ignoring interest rates and Delta) negative Theta) means that one benefits from volatility (positive Gamma), but loses money over time (negative Theta) – one net profits if prices move more than expected, and net loses if prices move less than expected.

== Convexity adjustments ==
From a modeling perspective, convexity adjustments arise every time the underlying financial variables modeled are not a martingale under the pricing measure. Applying Girsanov's theorem allows expressing the dynamics of the modeled financial variables under the pricing measure and therefore estimating this convexity adjustment. Typical examples of convexity adjustments include:

- Quanto options: the underlying is denominated in a currency different from the payment currency. If the discounted underlying is martingale under its domestic risk neutral measure, it is not any more under the payment currency risk neutral measure
- Constant maturity swap (CMS) instruments (swaps, caps/floors)
- Option-adjusted spread (OAS) analysis for mortgage-backed securities or other callable bonds
- IBOR forward rate calculation from Eurodollar futures
- IBOR forwards under LIBOR market model (LMM)
