= Swap rate =

For interest rate swaps, the swap rate is the fixed rate that the swap "receiver" demands in exchange for the uncertainty of having to pay a short-term (floating) rate, e.g. 3 months LIBOR over time. (At any given time, the market's forecast of what LIBOR will be in the future is reflected in the forward LIBOR curve.) Analogous to YTM for bonds, the swap rate is then the market's quoted price for entering the swap in question.

At the time of the swap agreement, the total value of the swap's fixed rate flows will be equal to the value of expected floating rate payments implied by the forward LIBOR curve; see Swap (finance)#Valuation.

As forward expectations for LIBOR change, so will the fixed rate that investors demand to enter into new swaps.

Swaps are typically quoted in this fixed rate, or alternatively in the “swap spread,” which is the difference between the swap rate and the U.S. Treasury bond yield (or equivalent local government bond yield for non-U.S. swaps) for the same maturity.

In most emerging markets with underdeveloped government bond markets, the swap curve is more complete than the treasury yield curve, and is thus used as the benchmark curve.

== Par swap rate ==
The swap rate is commonly understood as the par fixed rate on an interest rate swap. At inception of a standard fixed-for-floating interest rate swap, the fixed rate is set so that the present value of the fixed-rate payments equals the present value of the expected floating-rate payments, giving the swap a value of approximately zero to both counterparties before transaction costs and credit adjustments.

Because the par swap rate is derived from market discount factors and expected floating-rate cash flows, it changes as the underlying interest-rate curve changes. The resulting set of swap rates across maturities forms a swap curve, which is used as a benchmark for valuing interest rate derivatives and for comparing swap rates with government bond yields through swap spreads.
