= Commodity swap =

Finance term

A commodity swap is a type of swap agreement whereby a floating (or market or spot) price based on an underlying commodity is traded for a fixed price over a specified period. The vast majority of commodity swaps involve oil. Many airline and rail companies enter oil commodity swap deals in order to secure lower oil costs in the long term.

== Concept ==
A commodity swap is similar to a fixed-floating interest rate swap. The difference is that in an interest rate swap, the floating leg is based on standard interest rates such as LIBOR and EURIBOR. However, in a commodity swap, the floating leg is based on the price of underlying commodity like oil, sugar, and precious metals. No commodities are exchanged during the trade. In this swap, the user of a commodity would secure a maximum price and agree to pay a financial institution this fixed price. Then, in return, the user would get payments based on the market price for the commodity involved. On the other side, a producer wishes to fix the income and would agree to pay the market price to a financial institution, in return for receiving fixed payments for the commodity.
