= Credit Support Annex =

United Kingdom legal document

A Credit Support Annex (CSA) is a legal document that regulates credit support (collateral) to mitigate counterparty risk in financial contracts. Effectively, a CSA defines the terms under which collateral is posted or transferred between swap counterparties to mitigate the credit risk arising from in the money derivative positions. It is one of the four parts that make up an ISDA Master Agreement but is not mandatory; it is possible to have an ISDA agreement without a CSA but normally not a CSA without an ISDA.

If on any Valuation Date, the Delivery Amount equals or exceeds the Pledgor's Minimum Transfer Amount, the Pledgor must transfer Eligible Collateral with a Value at least equal to the Delivery Amount. The Delivery Amount is the amount the Credit Support Amount exceeds the Value of all posted Collateral held by the Secured Party. The Credit Support Amount is the Secured Party's Exposure plus Pledgor's Independent Amounts minus Secured Party's Independent Amounts minus the Pledgor's Threshold. The Collateral must meet the Eligibility criteria in the agreement, which may prescribe which currencies it may be in, what types of bonds are allowed, and which haircuts are applied. There are also rules for the settlement of disputes arising over valuation of derivative positions.

To distinguish between the Schedule to the Master Agreement and the Credit Support Annex, the schedules are numbered as Parts and CSA are numbered as Paragraphs. To customise the requirements of an OTC Transaction, the clauses which are required are added as Paragraph 11 (for London Agreements) and as Paragraph 13 (for New York Agreements).

Under English Law, CSA are considered transactions: Any collateral listed as "Eligible Collateral" is delivered as an outright transfer of title. The collateral taker becomes the outright owner of that collateral free of any third party interest.

Compare the "Outright transfer" offered under English Law Credit Support Annex with "Security Interest" under New York Law Credit Support Annex. Both New York Law Credit Support Annex and an English law Credit Support Annex operate to create security interests in the collateral being posted, the differences are operational and can be material upon an insolvency of the other party.

- English law credit support annex operates by way of outright transfers of title to the posted collateral
- Parties might select New York or English CSA for many operational considerations, also the choice of credit support documentation can materially change the parties’ rights and obligations and their standing upon an insolvency of the other party

== Sources ==
- http://www.isda.org/
- http://www.mayerbrown.com/public_docs/JIBFL_24_1_Parker.pdf
- http://www.ybs.co.uk/your_society/treasury/documents/transaction-documents/ISDA-Credit-Support-Annex.PDF
- http://www.mofo.com/files/Uploads/Images/Credit-Crunch-Related-Issues-Arising-with-Derivatives.pdf
