= Basis swap =

Type of interest rate swap

A basis swap is an interest rate swap which involves the exchange of two floating rate financial instruments. A basis swap functions as a floating-floating interest rate swap under which the floating rate payments are referenced to different bases.

== Usage of basis swaps for hedging ==
Basis risk occurs for positions that have at least one paying and one receiving stream of cash flows that are driven by different factors and the correlation between those factors is less than one. Entering into a Basis Swap may offset the effect of gains or losses resulting from changes in the basis, thus reducing basis risk.

1. against exposure to currency fluctuations (for example, 1 mo USD LIBOR for 1 mo GBP LIBOR)
2. against one index in the favor of another (for example, 1 mo USD T-bill for 1 mo USD LIBOR)
3. different points on a yield curve (for example, 1 mo USD LIBOR for 6 mo USD LIBOR)

== Basis swaps in energy commodities ==
In energy markets, a basis swap is a swap on the price differential for a product and a major index product (e.g. Brent Crude or Henry Hub gas).

== Cross-currency basis and market developments ==
Following the global financial crisis of 2007–2008, persistent deviations from covered interest rate parity (CIP) led to sustained cross-currency basis spreads in major currency markets. These spreads reflect funding pressures, balance sheet constraints of financial institutions, and regulatory capital requirements that limit arbitrage activity.

== See also ==
- Interest rate swap
- Basis trading
