= Counterparty =

Legal entity exposed to financial risk

A counterparty (sometimes contraparty) is a legal entity, unincorporated entity, or collection of entities to which an exposure of financial risk may exist. The word became widely used in the 1980s, particularly at the time of the Basel I deliberations in 1988.

Well-drafted contracts usually attempt to spell out in explicit detail what each counterparty's rights and obligations are in every conceivable circumstance, though there are limits. There are general provisions for how counterparties are treated under the law, and (at least in common law legal systems) there are many legal precedents that shape the common law.

== Financial services sector ==
Within the financial services sector, the term market counterparty is used to refer to governments, public banks, national monetary authorities and international monetary organisations such as the World Bank Group that act as the ultimate guarantor for loans and indemnities. The term may also be applied, in a more general sense, to companies acting in this role.

Also within financial services, counterparty can refer to brokers, investment banks, and other securities dealers that serve as the contracting party when completing "over the counter" securities transactions. The term is generally used in this context in relation to "counterparty risk", which is the risk of monetary loss a firm may be exposed to if the counterparty to an over-the-counter securities trade encounters difficulty meeting its obligations under the terms of the transaction.

== Insurance sector ==
Within the insurance sector, this term is extended to include companies offering or requiring high-level retrocession of insurance risk to insurance companies in a role similar to that offered by governments. This term, over time, has become more generally applied to companies offering or requiring retrocession and other forms of reinsurance.
