= Spread =

Spread may refer to:

== Places ==
- Spread, West Virginia

== Arts, entertainment, and media ==
- Spread (film), a 2009 film.
- $pread, a quarterly magazine by and for sex workers
- "Spread", a song by OutKast from their 2003 album Speakerboxxx/The Love Below
- Spreadability, a concept in media studies
- Page spread, an aspect of book design

== Finance ==
- Spread, the difference in price between related securities, as in:
  - Bid–offer spread, between the buying and selling price of a commodity and/or security
  - Credit spread (bond), on bonds
  - Option-adjusted spread, on mortgage backed securities where the borrower has the right to repay in full
  - Options spread, building blocks of option trading strategies.
  - Spread trade, between two related securities or commodities
    - Spread option, payoff is based on the difference in price between two underlying assets
  - Yield spread, difference in percentage rate of return of two instruments
  - Z-spread, on mortgage backed securities

== Gambling and sports ==
- Spread limit, a limit on a raise in poker
- The score difference being wagered on in spread betting
- Spread offense, an offensive scheme in American football designed to stretch the field horizontally

== Mathematics ==
- Spread (intuitionism), a concept in intuitionistic mathematics
- Spread (rational trigonometry), the measure of line inclination in rational trigonometry
- Spread (projective geometry), a partition of a geometry into subspaces
- Spread polynomials, a polynomial sequence arising in rational trigonometry
- Spread (topology), a cardinal function defined on topological spaces, also known as the hereditary cellularity
- Statistical dispersion

== Science and technology ==
- Seafloor spreading, the process leading to continental drift
- Spread spectrum, communications signals over a range of frequencies
- Spread Toolkit - an open source toolkit that provides a high performance messaging service
- Spreading dynamics, the wetting of a surface, see Wetting#Spreading dynamics
- Spreadsheet, computer application software
- Temperature-Dewpoint spread, dew point depression

== Other uses ==
- Spread (food), an edible paste put on other foods.
- Spread or bedspread, a bed covering for protective or decorative use
- Spread, the laying of Tarot cards for divinatory uses
- Spreading (debate), a term used for speed reading in policy debate
- Spread, real estate property or land
- Spread (prison food), term for a prison meal made by inmates
