= Constant Maturity Mortgage =

Benchmark for mortgage-backed securities

In the United States secondary mortgage market, the Constant Maturity Mortgage (CMM) rate is a financial index representing the theoretical yield of a par value agency residential mortgage-backed security (agency RMBS). Unlike the constant-maturity treasury (CMT) which reflects government borrowing costs, the CMM reflects the yield required by investors to transact agency RMBS (such as those issued by Fannie Mae or Freddie Mac) at a price of 100.

The CMM rate is primarily used as a benchmark for hedging prepayment risk and convexity risk by institutional investors, mortgage servicers, and hedge funds.

== Methodology ==
The CMM rate does not correspond to the yield of a directly traded security because most MBS trade at a premium or a discount to par in the "To-Be-Announced" (TBA) market. Instead, the rate is derived through linear interpolation between the two coupons bracketing par (the one trading just above par and the one trading just below par), which are typically the most liquid coupons. Because it represents a par-priced security, it allows traders to value the "mortgage basis" without the price distortions caused by high-premium or deep-discount securities.

== Forward derivation and projection ==
The quoting of the CMM rate is intrinsically linked to the dollar roll market, which serves as the primary financing mechanism for the underlying mortgage-backed securities. Because CMM represents a synthetic projection of a mortgage yield at a fixed maturity, the "forward CMM" rate must be adjusted to account for the cost of carry implied by the roll market.

=== The role of the "drop" ===
In the MBS market, the difference between the price of a security for immediate delivery and its price for forward delivery is known as the "drop." This drop represents the marked-implied benefit of earning the coupon income from the physical security versus the cost of financing it. For CMM benchmarks, the drop is the primary variable used to derive the forward-settling mortgage rate:

$$\text{CMM}_\text{forward}\approxeq \text{CMM}_\text{spot} - \text{Roll Carry} + \text{Convexity Adjustment}$$

Whenever the drop increases because demand for the physical security outweighs supply, the implied carry rises, and the dollar roll market is said to become "special". The high carry leads to a lower projected CMM rate, causing the benchmark to trade at a tighter spread relative to other benchmarks like treasury yields or interest rate swaps.

=== Basis risk in synthetic benchmarking ===
The reliance on dollar roll levels creates basis risk for practitioners using CMM-linked instruments to hedge mortgage servicing rights (MSR). While the CMM provides a "constant maturity" projection against interest rate movements, it may not perfectly track the idiosyncratic supply and demand shocks of the dollar roll market. If a "squeeze" occurs in the roll, the observed CMM yield may diverge from the actual yield of the physical MBS pools being hedged, resulting in a decoupling of the hedge from the underlying asset.

== Financial applications ==
=== CMM swaps ===
CMM is the underlying index for CMM swaps, which are hedging instruments designed to offset the delta risk of mortgage servicing rights (MSR). In a CMM swap, one party typically pays a fixed rate in exchange for the floating CMM rate. Because the CMM rate represents the yield on a par-priced security, using these instruments reduces basis risk for mortgage originators (compared to using Treasury-based hedges).

=== Spread analysis ===
The "mortgage spread" is calculated as the difference between the CMM and a comparable benchmark, such as the 10-year Treasury note. This spread is a key indicator of the health of the housing finance market; a widening spread suggests that the market requires a higher premium for mortgage-specific risks (such as volatility) relative to risk-free government debt.

== See also ==
- Mortgage yield
- Option-adjusted spread
