= Yield curve (disambiguation) =

Yield curve or Yield-curve spread usually refers to the relationships among bond yields of different maturities.

Yield curve or Yield-curve spread may also refer to:

== In economics ==
- Yield spread – difference between the quoted rates of return on two different investments
- I-spread — difference between a bond yield and an interpolation from the Treasury yield curve
- Z-spread — parallel spread of a bond yield over the zero-volatility Treasury yield curve

== In materials science ==
- Stress–strain curve — physical relationship between the stress and strain of a particular material
