= Interracial adoption =

Placement of a child with adoptive parents of an ethnicity different than theirs

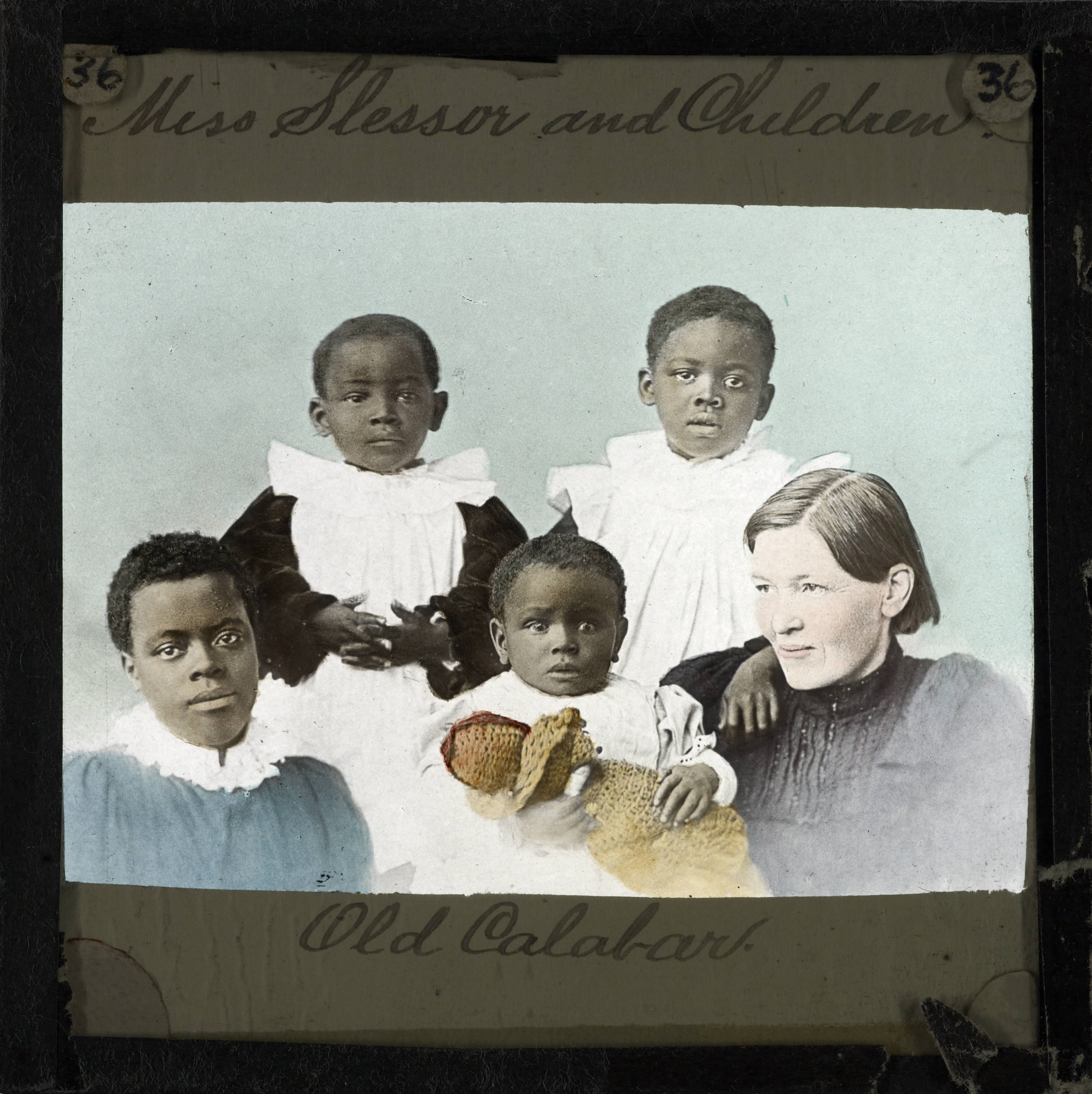
Interracially adoptive family in the late 19th century

Interracial adoption (historically referred to as transracial adoption) refers to the act of placing a child of one racial or ethnic group with adoptive parents of another racial or ethnic group.

Interracial adoption is not inherently the same as transcultural or international adoption. However, in some circumstances an adoption may be interracial, international, and transcultural at the same time (or some combination of two of those).

== Statistics ==
Based on the Adoption and Foster Care Analysis and Reporting System (AFCARS) in the U.S., the fiscal year of 1998 showed that approximately 57% of children currently in foster care were of non-Caucasian background. Out of all foster children waiting for adoption 21% are Black, 23% are Hispanic, 2% are American Indian/Alaska Native, 0% are Asian/Pacific Islander/Native Hawaiian, and 1% are unknown/unable to determine. According to data from 2019, 50.7% of adoptees that year were White, 20.1% Hispanic, 16.5% Black or African American, 9.2% of two or more races, 1.6% Native American/Alaskan native, 1.2% unidentifiable, 0.35% Asian, and 0.27% Hawaiian or Pacific Islander. The most recent estimate of interracial adoption was performed in 1987 by the National Health Interview Survey (NHIS) and it found that 1% of white women adopt black children, 5% of white women adopt children of other races, and 2% of women of other races adopt white children (estimates include foreign-born).

The US Census 2000 found that "White (and no other race), not Hispanic children made up the majority of all categories of children of householders under 18: about 58% of adopted children, 64% of biological children" and "Of the 1.7 million households with adopted children, about 308,000 (18%) contained members of different races."

In the UK between 2008 and 2009, approximately 2,700 white children were adopted compared to only 410 mixed-race children and only 90 black children Approximately 1 in 10 children in care are black and 1 in 9 children in care come from a racially mixed background. Black, mixed-race, and Asian children typically wait to be adopted on average three years longer than white children. Children of mixed ethnicities are more likely than other children to be placed for adoption. Adoption placement of children of mixed ethnicities is difficult because it is influenced by values, ideology, and anti-oppressive practices that need to be considered within the practice.

Interracial adoption grew significantly from 1999 to 2005 where it reached its peak year at 585 adoptions to the United States. Following 2005, interracial adoption into the US declined with 288 adoptions in the year 2011. From 1999 to 2011, there has been 233,934 adoptions into the United States from other countries across the globe. Of the total adoptions, 39.4% (92,202 children) were under the age of 12 months. Also, 63% (146,516 children) were female. Overall, children from China were the most common to be adopted. 66,630 were from China and Russia was the second largest country with 45,112 children.

== History ==
Before World War II it was very rare for white couples to adopt a child of a different race, and every effort was made in order to match a child with the skin color and religion of the adoptive family. Then in 1944 the Boys and Girls Aid Society took an interest in the increasing number of minority children waiting to be adopted which focused on children from Asian American, Native American, and African American heritage. Children of Asian and Native American heritage were most easily placed outside of their racial group while those of African American heritage proved more difficult. The campaign was called "Operation Brown Baby", and its objective was to find adoptive homes even if from a different race. The first candidate in this operation, Noah Turner, was a Chinese baby adopted into a Caucasian family in 1947.

During the civil rights movement, a few regional adoption agencies began challenging race-matching in adoptions by placing some African American children in non-minority households. Organizations, including the Open Door Society and the Council on Adoptable Children, likewise began to publicize the needs of these orphans of color. However, only small amounts of African American children were ever adopted by white parents, reaching their high around 1970. This also spurred rapid growth in international adoptions, the numbers more than tripled from 733 cases in 1968 to 2,574 cases in 1971, where large numbers of Asian children were adopted by Caucasian American families. (China has now halted its foreign adoption program.) However, in 1972, the National Association of Black Social Workers formally condemned interracial adoption, citing that adoptees were at risk of developing a poor racial identity due to a lack of contact with role models of the same race. In the 1990s, the placement of black children into non-black homes virtually came to a complete stop.

However, international transracial adoptions have continued. In the early 1970s, early transracial adoption proponents like Bernice Gottlieb likewise spurred the adoption of Asian children, not orphaned but who were living in stigmatized conditions, but whose parents wished to offer their children a better life outside their countries.

Harry and Bertha Holt also played a large role in introducing the concept of interracial adoption in the United States. Harry and Bertha Holt were Evangelical farmers from Oregon. They saw it as their duty to help Korean children from the deplorable conditions many of them were in. As such, Congress was lobbied and in 1955, "Bill for Relief of Certain War Orphans", often referred to as the Holt Bill, was passed. This allowed for the Holts to adopt 8 Korean American children from South Korea. This adoption was highly public and, in many ways for many Americans, reshaped the concept of what a family could look like.

== Additional information ==
Families formed across racial, national, and biological boundaries represent a growing demographic, adding to the pervasive, historical diversity of family forms in the United States (Coontz, 2008). From 1990 to 2009, the number of U.S. adoptions of foreign-born orphans increased in unprecedented numbers, rising from 7,093 children to 12,753 in 2009—an 80% increase: China ranked as the top sending country, and Vietnam ranked as the seventh highest (U.S. Department of State, 2009). Whereas diversification in the family form is not a new phenomenon, it often appears so, given that family communication scholarship on nontraditional families is a relatively recent development.

Since 2009, there has been a distinct decline in foreign adoption in the US. In 2023, the number of adoptees was just 1,300.

== Law ==
In 1994, the Howard M. Metzenbaum Multiethnic Placement Act (MEPA) was passed. It prohibits an agency that receives Federal assistance and is involved in foster care and adoptive placements from delaying or denying the placement of a child based on race, color, or national origin of the child or adoptive/foster parent. Then, in 1996 it was amended with the Interethnic Adoption Provisions, also known as the Interethnic Placement Act. These provisions forbid agencies from delaying or denying the placement of a child solely on the basis of race and national origin. The purpose of these revisions was to strengthen compliance and enforcement of the procedures, remove any misleading language, and demand that discrimination would not be tolerated.

Another important law regarding interracial adoptions was the Adoption and Safe Families Act that was implemented in 1997. The purpose of this law is to reduce the time that a child spends in foster care by terminating parental rights of children who had been in foster care for 15 of the last 22 months, requiring permanency hearings annually for all foster care children, and expanding subsidies for adoption. The act also sought to reduce the instability and abuse problems in the foster care system by putting stricter background checks on adoptive and foster families, provided funding for preventative and support services, and expanded foster children's healthcare coverage. Critics, however, argue that it also takes the emphasis off of trying to keep children with their biological parents and that the act increased racial inequality. In particular, critics target the termination of parental rights, saying that it disproportionately affects Black families, who were already more likely to be separated by child welfare services, by permanently separating Black children from their parents.

== Academic research ==
When discussing the topic of parents adopting a child of a different race, the terms interracial adoption and transracial adoption are commonly used interchangeably. Historically, most notably in the 1960s, the word interracial has been used more frequently. However, upon looking at multiple websites for modern adoption agencies, these companies are using the word “transracial” more than ever before. The interesting part about this research is that searching up the keyword “interracial” would bring up suggestions for personal articles from adoptees about their experiences/stories. Whereas searching up the term “transracial” would bring up informational texts and support tools for parents seeking to adopt.

Clearly, each word is tied to a different connotative meaning. Transracial appears to be more professional, informational, and widely used for academic texts. Interracial suggests a personal aspect of adoption and shows up in more blogs, stories, and opinion pieces.

=== Adolescent adjustment ===
Adolescent adjustment for interracial adoptees can be qualitatively studied based on the principals of Identity Based Socialization. Identity based socialization is defined as the ability of parents to impact their children's morals and values related to identities such as adoption, race, or ethnicity; these socialization techniques have been positively correlated with increased psychological well-being and self esteem. Ethnic-racial socialization consists of three components: cultural socialization, preparation for bias, and promotion of mistrust. For interracial adoptees socialization can be understood in the context of a multiplicity of identities including the transracial adoption (i.e., a parent adopts a child of a different race, most commonly white parents and children of color).

For interracial adoptees, many white parents have increased difficulty connecting with and helping their child embrace their racial identity. This is often linked to a lack of shared racial identity as well as understanding of the perspectives and lived experience of racial/ethnic minority individuals. For example, Black transracial adoptees report experiencing more racial discrimination than their White parents. A component of this may be that white parents do not know how to address race-based discrimination and instead engage in an avoidant approach to race-based conversation, leading transracial adoptees to feel misunderstood and less likely to report experiences of racial discrimination to their parents. Research has shown that transracial adoptees experience feelings of exclusion from peers of both their racial identity as well as the majority (i.e., White). This creates an internal struggle to find belonging in their community and among their family members.

For LGBTQ+ families, there was a positive correlation between LGBT family socialization and racial/cultural socialization which led to an overall open adaptive communication. The associations of LGBT family socialization with racial/cultural socialization as well as with adoptive communicative openness may be related to the higher proportion of transracial adoptions among same-sex couples compared to different-sex couples. This work adds further evidence to the notion that family processes, rather than parental sexual orientation, are most closely tied with children's outcomes.

This racial socialization is critical to furthering the wellbeing of interracial adoptees and helping them to connect with their personal identity.

Studies have found “little evidence of increased maladjustment among adopted adolescents compared to non-adopted” children and also found little difference between adjustment in different subcategories of adoption (same-race, different-race, etc.) One study found that comparisons of mean levels of adjustment consistently have revealed nonsignificant differences between groups of transracial adoptees and same-race adoptees. This study found that interracial adoptees fare overall about the same as their same-race adopted counterparts across the 12 adjustment measures investigated. These measures investigated indices of academic, familial, psychological, and health outcomes for 4 groups of interracial and same-race adopted adolescents. Specifically, interracial adoptees had significantly higher grades and significantly higher academic expectations but marginally more distant father relationships and higher levels of psychosomatic symptoms than their same-race adopted counterparts. Also, Asian adolescents adopted by white parents had both the highest grades and the highest levels of psychosomatic symptoms, whereas Black adolescents adopted by Black parents reported the highest levels of depression. On the other hand, Black adoptees adopted by white and Black families reported higher levels of self-worth than non-Black adoptees.

Research on Korean Transracial Adoptees has shown that they often view their identity as being on the fringe. KTA's adopted into white European American families tend to experience this to the greatest degree. At home, parents may minimize the racial differences within their own family in an attempt to show that they are all together, as a family should be. The damage in this approach is that it provides very little room for a KTA to discuss the more unique challenges they face, as a result of not looking like their family or peers. This can lead KTA's to believe that they must ignore or reject the Korean side of their identity, in order to gain membership to their white community and family. On the opposite side of this, KTA's may feel an outsider in their home country. Often unable to speak the language and interpret the nonverbal subtitles of Korean culture, they are again looked at as an outsider. This duality of being an outsider within both communities places the KTA on a fringe. This fringe identity has crossovers to all form of adoptees.

=== Appearance discomfort ===
Evidence also showed that extra-family forces, for example societal racism, did negatively impact adjustment outcomes. Particularly, experiences of discrimination generated feelings of appearance discomfort. One of this study's most interesting findings showed that interracial adoptive parents' decisions on where to live had a substantial impact upon their children's adjustments. Interracial adoptive parents living in predominantly white communities tended to have adoptees that experienced more discomfort. Many interracial adopted children may experience negativity from their peers or others in society, such as micro-aggressions. This may cause confusion as to which identity- race/ethnicity or adoption- is being directly targeted. This discrimination may be more prevalent for Black and Asian children, who appear unmistakably different from their white parents. Such adoptees, are most likely to encounter such societal discrimination. about their appearance than those who lived in integrated settings. One study found that Asian transracial adoptees experienced higher levels of appearance discomfort in communities that were all white, and also found that higher levels of appearance discomfort correlated with less non-white people in their community. The study also found that "discrimination against the transracial adoptee, and discomfort about their appearance are found as significant correlates associated with adjustment difficulties".

In a study conducted at Leiden University, Centre for Child & Family Studies adoptees self-esteem was analyzed. It was found that adoptees show normal levels of self esteem despite their somewhat elevated risks of short stature, lower school achievement, and behavior problems and their substantially elevated risk of learning problems and mental health referrals Furthermore, differences were not found in self-esteem between transracial and same-race adoptees.

Ryan Gustafsson conducted a unique study at the University of Melbourne which took a deeper dive into theorizing Korean transracial adoptee experiences. This study looked specifically at "Ambiguity, substitutability, and racial embodiment. Gustaffson leads by noting that Korean Adoptees make up an astonishing 7% of the Korean American population (Park Nelson, 2016: 130). Gustaffson also notes that, although popular opinion may lead one to believe that KTA's had no parents, a considerable amount of these adoptees do in fact have at least one living parent. Due to the circumstances of adoption, Gustaffson introduces the concept of hyper(in)visibility. Gustaffson explains "I use the term (hyper/in) visibility' to capture this sense of simultaneous exposure and hiddenness, but also to emphasize how, for transracial adoptees, visibility is achieved via invisibility (Gustaffson, 2015). That is to say that, for many interracial adoptees, in order to accept their adopted identity, they must come to terms with the loss of their birth identity.

=== Identity development ===
Transracial adoptees are posed with the challenge of understanding the differences between their own view of identity and the identity reflected and modeled by their parents. Identity entails not only race, but also heritage, culture, ethnicity and many other descriptors. Studies have sought to explore how children of interracial adoption are affected in these varying categories. Research suggests that the age of adoption and parenting acculturation styles may influence the way in which transracial children construct and build their own identities.

Many groups continue to argue that children put up for adoption should be matched with parents of the same race in an effort to better help the child assimilate culturally and racially. This idea is commonly known as race-matching, when the adoptee and adoptive parents are paired based on race. In 2008, the Evan B. Donaldson Adoption Institute reignited the interracial adoption debate with its recommendation that race should be considered in selecting adoptive parents for children awaiting placement. These reports examined adoption of Black children by white parents. They found that interracial adoptees face challenges if they grew up in homogeneous white communities because they felt out of place with both their adoptive families and the Black community. The findings from the Donaldson report links the challenges that interracial adoptees face with socialization practices of adoptive parents that minimize racial differences, particularly when parents do not facilitate their children's understanding of and comfort with their own ethnicities.

However, there has also been academic research on transracial adoption that has shown that Black children can build strong racial identities when adopted by white parents. In light of this debate, much research has been specifically designed to analyze how transracial adoption affects the construction of a child's personal identity, and whether the circumstance of transracial adoption present such acclaimed negative influence on development. One study compared Black children who had been placed with Black adoptive families and Black children who had been transracially adopted. They measured self-esteem and perception of racial identity. While there was no difference in perception of racial identity, there was a difference in how they perceived their own racial identity. This study relates back to the importance of how influential transracial adopted parents acculturation, socialization, and awareness of race plays into fostering a positive racial identity for the child.

Another study looked at both the parents and the children to measure how color-blind racial attitudes would affect engagement in activities of the adoptee's heritage. Racial color blindness is the sociological concept that race-based differences do not need to be taken into account when interacting with others. The study found that parents scoring lower on color-blind racial attitudes positively correlated with high scores on acculturation and socialization levels, meaning parents that were aware of their cultural differences took part in more culturally diverse activities with their adopted child. This study looked at international adoptions, which subsequently includes transracial adoptees, but was not specifically focused on a particular subset of individuals.

Another study focused on Korean transracial adoptees sought to explore self-concept and acculturation through measurements of religion, honesty, relationships with opposite sex, physical appearance, general self-concept, math, emotional stability, and relationships with parents in relation to age of placement of Korean adoptees. The significant findings in this study highlighted that the later the age at which the Korean adoptees were placed, the higher Honesty self-concept scores were. The implications of this study presume that the older a child is when they are adopted, the more secure they are in their ethnic identity.

Many transracial adoptees go through a unique process of deciding how they would like to identify. Oftentimes, it is not until an individual's late twenties or early thirties in which they begin to think about their birth family. Their birth identity is usually perceived as a loss or something the adoptee had to give up in order to be where they are now. Richard M. Lee and associates published a unique study in 2020 which addresses this feeling of loss. They call it Birth Family Thoughts (BFT) and created a scale to measure any adoptee's ranking. The Birth Family Thoughts Scale (BFTS) is used to measure an individual's curiosity about their birth family. Oftentimes transracial adoptees may think of their birth family and the life that they could have had with them, and this scale can measure these thoughts which opens the door for more research to be done relating to how BFT plays into self esteem, confidence and psychological well being.

Another unique process of identity development which some transracial adoptees go through is the process of name reclamation. One study in particular focuses on the process of name reclamation which Korean Transracial Adoptees go through. For many of these individuals, they are born without their true Korean name. Documents in the orphanages of South Korea are lacking in accuracy. Many of the orphans may also be foundlings, babies that were found with no guardian, and any name they have on record is likely one thought of by the social worker. This process is different from that of the United States in which parents of adopted children amend their child's birth certificate to include their new name, parents, and place of birth, which is often the birthplace of their new parents. The child's original birth certificate is often sealed, which may give adopted children the sense that being adopted is taboo and a part of their identity that should be hidden.

=== Ethnocentric bias ===
Finally, some research has examined the empirical studies of interracial adoption themselves. These studies address whether past research that claims that interracial adoption positively benefits children of color, particularly black children, may have methodological difficulties. Specifically, these studies analyze the presence of an ethnocentric bias in legal and scientific assessments of children's well-being and adjustment.

== Assimilation into the family ==
Multicultural families have both similarities and differences from the biological family. A family that has participated with interracial adoption shares similar roles, life stages, and transition points as other families. The challenge comes, however, with the pursuit of a shared family identity through communication. Linda D. Manning conducted a research study on this topic titled "Presenting Opportunities: Communicatively Constructing a Shared Family Identity". The research question she posed initially was, How do members of a multiracial adoptive family communicatively co-construct a shared family identity that emphasizes similarities and allows for difference? The results of the study found that having "cultural artifacts" in the home allow for the embrace of the differing cultures represented in the family. It "creates a worldview that embraces diversity – not just races and ethnicities directly related to those embodied by family members. The choice to embrace multiple races and ethnicities... affirms the multiethnic experience" (Manning, 2006). The study also showed that parents, in any family, present the family identity and the child responds. This is where an interracial family would share the similar roles as in a biological family. The parents act as educators and spokesperson. The children act as learners, challengers, and experts. The research also showed that in an interracial family, there is tension between uniqueness and conformity. It is difficult but essential to balance these two qualities within the family identity. Manning concludes the research study by describing how "the constructs of a shared family identity is both a process and a product". The process includes roles and themes within the family while the product is developed through communication. "A shared family identity is a group identity that encompasses individual identity characteristics shared by each family member, allows for salient differences between and among family members, and accounts for dialectic tensions that exist within family interactions, as well as between the family and the community".

According to Marlene Fine and Fern Johnson in their book The Interracial Adoption Option: Creating a Family Across Race, an interracially adopted child may experience a developmental arc when assimilating into the adopted family. A child may go through several stages when learning about their birth family. The child may have many questions. If the story of how the birth mother conceived the child involves abuse or rape, it may be difficult to explain to a young child (Fine and Johnson, 2013). The child may grieve their birth family, especially depending on the time of adoption. With honest and open communication that is age-appropriate, interracially adopted children can learn more about their birth family or culture while still being part of their adopted family.

It also important to consider how parents can support their child's preparedness for discrimination that they may face. In the American Journal of Orthopsychiatry, a 2019 study by Presseau and DeBlaere made some interesting findings. This study looked at perceived discrimination and its effect on the mental health of adult transracial adoptees. The study looked at 206 adult transracial adoptees who were raised by white parents. Findings showed that the effect of racial socialization on behalf of the parents were different in respect to which mental illness was being looked at. Racial discrimination was related to psychological distress. With more perceived discrimination associated with greater levels of psychological distress. However, the findings of the linkage between discrimination and distress support that it is important for adoptive parents to incorporate racial socialization in the child's upbringing.

== Education prior to interracial adoption ==
The United States Department of State offers multiple resources for parents wanting to adopt such as the "Intercountry Adoption from A-Z" publication, Adoption guides, Adoptive families committees, FAQs, and Visa information. All of these and more are available on their website. The article, "Adoptive Parent's Framing of Laypersons' Conceptions of Family" by Elizabeth A. Suter, Kristine L. Reyes, & Robert L. Ballard, addresses the importance of parents preparing for outside comments from others. This study showed that families that had participated in interracial adoption had experienced comments such as "their families violated the canonical view of family in terms of racial dissimilarity between members, construction of family via adoption, and adoption of a child born out of the United States". The article uses a battleground as a metaphor for an adoptive family. The external view of the family does pose as a challenge for interracial families. The results suggest that prior to interracial adoption, parents "should be made aware of social stigmas... and be provided with opportunities to develop a critical consciousness about such stigmas". The research also suggests and encourages required statewide courses for prospective parents.

Similarly, the United States Department of Health and Human Services has extensive literature on how to prepare families for racially and culturally diverse adoptions. The resources provided range from webinars, articles, and books to first person experiences and recommendations from social workers.

== Support and opposition ==
=== Controversy ===
Interracial adoption remains a topic of contention amongst the public, as many discuss the racial and social implications of the practice, which most often involves a racial-minority child being adopted into a white family. The controversy surround interracial adoption comes, in large part, from the fear that racism may influence adoptees adopted into white families. The National Association of Black Social Workers (NABSW), for example, argued that transracial adoption was, in essence, a form of racial and cultural genocide.

Ethnocentrism in the US has an impact on adoption policies. The adoption of interracial and international children have been debated for several decades. Specifically, associations around the globe have focused on the adoption of Black children as the point of contention. African American, Hispanic, Asian American, and Native American children represented 60% (75,722 out of 127,000) of the children in foster care waiting to be adopted in 1999. Due to the controversy surrounding domestic transracial adoption, many families now favor international adoption. International adoptions now account for approximately 85% of all transracial adoptions. Americans have also started to transition from domestic transracial adoption to international. Annual adoption rates, for instance, have risen dramatically from 1989 to 2001 with the majority of adoptions from Asian countries.

Racism against interracial families has decreased since the distinct spike of interracial adoption in the US in the ethnocentric bias suggests that parents of a non-minority group cannot provide the racial and ethnic identity the child needs. In the US the divide is about equal between those who approve of transracial adoptions and those who do not. In an effort to promote the adoption of Black children, legislation was signed into effect that makes it illegal for Agency and the States to receive federal funding to consider race for the adoption of children. Children of color are disproportionately represented among the population of children in the child foster and placement system, specifically Black children. Due to the ethnocentric bias of the situation, many of those children never leave the foster or placement system because it is now rare for non-White children to be placed in a White home.

As Western countries develop, more people are becoming open to adoption. When adoptive parents choose to internationally adopt, they are able to “choose” the race of their child. They can choose to adopt any child from any country that allows international adoption and they can generally know what race that child will be. However, in countries like the United States where there is not one set race and the demographic is more like a melting pot, oftentimes children of color in the domestic foster system are left out.

International adoption creates a greater gap between the parents and the child's culture. Not only does race factor into adoption but international adoption also create barriers between the child's biological culture and the culture that they are being brought into. Depending on the age of the child, ethnocentrism becomes stronger as the age of the child increases. Culture shock is a factor associated with opposition to international adoption. Specifically, as more countries try to promote domestic adoption and keep adoptees in their countries longer, those children are getting internationally adopted later. This contributes to the cultural gaps as the wait times increases and children have begun making relationships with the people, environment, and culture around them.

=== Support ===
A dichotomy exists in reference to the subject of interracial adoption. Critics of race matching say there is a darker side involving whites with lingering racist beliefs against mixing races. They argue that children are hurt most by the practice. "One of the problems with race-matching policies," says Donna Matias, a lawyer with the Institute of justice, "is that it leaves the children in the system to wait. They are thrown into a vicious cycle where the chances plummet that they will ever get adopted." Never getting adopted has been shown to have a negative impact on children. After aging out of foster care, 27% of males and 10% of females were incarcerated within 12 to 18 months. 50% were unemployed, 37% had not finished high school, 33% received public assistance, and 19% of females had given birth to children. Before leaving care, 47 percent were receiving some kind of counseling or medication for mental health problems; that number dropped to 21% after leaving care.

Recent legislation such as the Multiethnic Placement act of 1994 (MEPA), the Interethnic Adoption Provisions, and the Adoption and Safe Families act of 1997 are acts that aim to shorten the wait time of minority children in the child placement system.

From the 1960s to the 1970s, there was a significant increase of ethnic minority adoptions into White families. From the 1970s to the 1980s, there were many studies conducted in an attempted to prove that White families could successfully raise Black children. The adoption of minorities, specifically the emphasis of adopting Black children into White families is in some part an attempt to reverse racism and prejudice of transracial families. The NAACP, as well as other institutions, argue that a safe and welcoming home is better than no home at all.

The media has taken steps to normalize interracial adoption. Books, movies, and television shows have taken steps to be more inclusive of interracial families. By these examples, people are exposed to worlds where racial identities and ethnic identities may differ in contrast with the norms of those two identities being synonymous. Studies have shown that Children in a transracial household may attribute value to race but may fail to evaluate their worth based on race. Studies have shown that self-esteem is not negatively affected by interracial adoption despite the “lack” of a role model of the same race.

=== Opposition ===
Opposition to interracial adoption has been reactive to extreme misuse of adoption practices; for example Aboriginal Australians were taken from their parents, sterilized and then adopted for Christian upbringing. Similar cases happened with Native Americans. The National Association of Black Social Workers, which consisted of twelve members, opposed interracial adoption, saying it was "cultural suicide", but their opposition was opposed by such groups as the NAACP.

Other arguments opposing interracial adoption derive from deep-rooted problems within the foster and adoption system. Fiscal and racial issues have emerged from this system. There are times when child welfare agencies have opted for the cheaper living arrangement of the child instead of the best situation for them.

Segregation prevented citizens from even being able to conceptualize this concept for many years. Additionally, due to lingering hatred and racism, even in the 1960's, certain white families were desperately afraid of having their own children engage in interracial relationships. There are instances of families going as far as to have their children sent to birthing homes, in order to cover up the birth of a mixed race child. In some cases, these children would then be put up for adoption. As such, it was early fear and prejudice that resulted in the beginnings of American Transracial Adoption.

One study found that African American women (84%) and Caucasian/White men (72%) were less likely to approve of transracial adoption than African American men. Additionally, a recent public opinion survey of 1,416 people, for example, found that 47% of respondents believed international adoptees have more medical and behavioral problems than domestically adopted children.

== In popular culture ==
- Wuthering Heights describes the foundling Heathcliff's complexion as darker than that of his English adoptive family. Other characters liken him to a "gipsy" or "Lascar" in appearance, and speculate about his ancestry (“Who knows but your father was Emperor of China, and your mother an Indian queen?”).
- In both the 1975 novel and 1996 musical Ragtime, Coalhouse III (a Black American), is adopted by Mother (a white American) and Tateh (a Latvian American).
- Jessie follows a family in which three of the four children are interracial adoptees, two of which are also international.
- Blue Bayou, a film written and directed by Justin Chon, depicts a Korean-American man who was adopted by a white family and is at risk for deportation because his parents did not file for his citizenship. The movie is based on true stories about the struggles of interracial adoption and Child Citizenship Act of 2000.
- In For All Mankind, Kelly Baldwin (née Nguyễn Thị Hạnh, before adoption) is the adoptive daughter of Ed and Karen Baldwin from Vietnam, adopted following the death of their son Shane in 1974. Following in the footsteps of her adoptive father, Kelly would form part of the crews of the US's Sojourner Mars mission in 1994 and Helios's Titan mission in 2012.
- In the 2023 film Joy Ride, protagonist Audrey is a Chinese woman adopted as a baby by comically stereotypically white parents. Audrey loves her foster parents, but worries over her disconnect from both white American and Chinese cultures (to the point of not even being aware that she's actually Korean)

== See also ==
- Sixties Scoop
