= Collateral valuation adjustments =

Collateral valuation adjustment (ColVA) or appraisal subordination entitlement reduction (ASER) are commercial mortgage-backed security structuring innovations designed to improve overall transaction credit quality. Collateral valuation adjustments were created in response to rating agency concerns that, without such an adjustment, cash flow from mortgage loans likely to default would be paid to the first-loss class. The rationale behind appraisal reductions is to support proactively the credit rating of senior CMBS tranches by reducing cash-flow payments to the subordinate tranches.

== Role in CMBS cash-flow reporting ==
In commercial mortgage-backed securities reporting, collateral valuation adjustments are reflected through appraisal-based waterfall fields such as the Most Recent Net ASER Amount and Cumulative ASER Amount in the CRE Finance Council (CREFC) Investor Reporting Package.

CREFC educational materials describe appraisal subordination entitlement reduction (ASER) as a mechanism that determines how much interest the servicer will advance on a loan, and note that interest shortfalls may result from ASERs.

This reporting function makes collateral valuation adjustment relevant not only to credit analysis, but also to the monthly distribution waterfall in CMBS transactions, where appraisal-related reductions can affect the allocation of cash flow to subordinate classes.

== See also ==
- Real estate mortgage investment conduit
- Residential mortgage-backed security
