= Collateralized mortgage obligation =

Type of debt security backed by mortgages

A collateralized mortgage obligation (CMO) is a type of complex debt security that repackages and directs the payments of principal and interest from a collateral pool to different types and maturities of securities, thereby meeting investor needs.

CMOs were first created in 1983 by the investment banks Salomon Brothers and First Boston for the U.S. mortgage liquidity provider Freddie Mac. The Salomon Brothers team was led by Lewis Ranieri and the First Boston team by Laurence D. Fink, although Dexter Senft also later received an industry award for his contribution).

Legally, a CMO is a debt security issued by an abstraction—a special purpose entity—and is not a debt owed by the institution creating and operating the entity. The entity is the legal owner of a set of mortgages, called a pool. Investors in a CMO buy bonds issued by the entity, and they receive payments from the income generated by the mortgages according to a defined set of rules. With regard to terminology, the mortgages themselves are termed collateral, 'classes' refers to groups of mortgages issued to borrowers of roughly similar credit worthiness, tranches are specified fractions or slices, metaphorically speaking, of a pool of mortgages and the income they produce that are combined into an individual security, while the structure is the set of rules that dictates how the income received from the collateral will be distributed. The legal entity, collateral, and structure are collectively referred to as the deal. Unlike traditional mortgage pass-through securities, CMOs feature different payment streams and risks, depending on investor preferences. For tax purposes, CMOs are generally structured as Real Estate Mortgage Investment Conduits, which avoid the potential for "double-taxation".

Investors in CMOs include banks, hedge funds, insurance companies, pension funds, mutual funds, government agencies, and most recently central banks. This article focuses primarily on CMO bonds as traded in the United States.

The term "collateralized mortgage obligation" technically refers to a security issued by a specific type of legal entity dealing in residential mortgages, but investors also frequently refer to deals put together using other types of entities such as real estate mortgage investment conduits as CMOs.

== Purpose ==
The most basic way a mortgage loan can be transformed into a bond suitable for purchase by an investor would simply be to "split it". For example, a $300,000 30 year mortgage with an interest rate of 6.5% could be split into 300 1000-dollar bonds. These bonds would have a 30-year amortization, and an interest rate of 6.00% for example (with the remaining 0.50% going to the servicing company to send out the monthly bills and perform servicing work). However, this format of bond has various problems for various investors

- Even though the mortgage is 30 years, the borrower could theoretically pay off the loan earlier than 30 years, and will usually do so when rates have gone down, forcing the investor to have to reinvest his money at lower interest rates, something he may have not planned for. This is known as prepayment risk.
- A 30-year time frame is a long time for an investor's money to be locked away. Only a small percentage of investors would be interested in locking away their money for this long. Even if the average home owner refinanced their loan every 10 years, meaning that the average bond would only last 10 years, there is a risk that the borrowers would not refinance, such as during an extending high interest rate period, this is known as extension risk. In addition, the longer time frame of a bond, the more the price moves up and down with the changes of interest rates, causing a greater potential penalty or bonus for an investor selling his bonds early. This is known as interest rate risk.
- Most normal bonds can be thought of as "interest only loans", where the borrower borrows a fixed amount and then pays interest only before returning the principal at the end of a period. On a normal mortgage, interest and principal are paid each month, causing the amount of interest earned to decrease. This is undesirable to many investors because they are forced to reinvest the principal. This is known as reinvestment risk.
- On loans not guaranteed by the quasi-governmental agencies Fannie Mae or Freddie Mac, certain investors may not agree with the risk reward tradeoff of the interest rate earned versus the potential loss of principal due to the borrower not paying. The latter event is known as default risk.

Salomon Brothers and First Boston created the CMO concept to address these issues. A CMO is essentially a way to create many different kinds of bonds from the same mortgage loan so as to please many different kinds of investors. For example:

- A group of mortgages could create four different classes of bonds. The first group would receive any prepayments before the second group would, and so on. Thus the first group of bonds would be expected to pay off sooner, but would also have a lower interest rate. Thus a 30-year mortgage is transformed into bonds of various lengths suitable for various investors with various goals.
- A group of mortgages could create four different classes of bonds. Any losses would go against the first group, before going against the second group, etc. The first group would have the highest interest rate, while the second would have slightly less, etc. Thus an investor could choose the bond that is right for the risk they want to take (i.e. a conservative bond for an insurance company, a speculative bond for a hedge fund).
- A group of mortgages could be split into principal-only and interest-only bonds. The "principal-only" bonds would sell at a discount, and would thus be zero coupon bonds (e.g., bonds that you buy for $800 each and which mature at $1,000, without paying any cash interest). These bonds would satisfy investors who are worried that mortgage prepayments would force them to re-invest their money at the exact moment interest rates are lower; countering this, principal only investors in such a scenario would also be getting their money earlier rather than later, which equates to a higher return on their zero-coupon investment. The "interest-only" bonds would include only the interest payments of the underlying pool of loans. These kinds of bonds would dramatically change in value based on interest rate movements, e.g., prepayments mean less interest payments, but higher interest rates and lower prepayments means these bonds pay more, and for a longer time. These characteristics allow investors to choose between interest-only (IO) or principal-only (PO) bonds to better manage their sensitivity to interest rates, and can be used to manage and offset the interest rate-related price changes in other investments.

Whenever a group of mortgages is split into different classes of bonds, the risk does not disappear. Rather, it is reallocated among the different classes. Some classes receive less risk of a particular type; other classes more risk of that type. How much the risk is reduced or increased for each class depends on how the classes are structured.

== Credit protection ==
CMOs are most often backed by mortgage loans, which are originated by thrifts (savings and loans), mortgage companies, and the consumer lending units of large commercial banks. Loans meeting certain size and credit criteria can be insured against losses resulting from borrower delinquencies and defaults by any of the Government Sponsored Enterprises (GSEs) (Freddie Mac, Fannie Mae, or Ginnie Mae). GSE guaranteed loans can serve as collateral for "Agency CMOs", which are subject to interest rate risk but not credit risk. Loans not meeting these criteria are referred to as "Non-Conforming", and can serve as collateral for "private label mortgage bonds", which are also called "whole loan CMOs". Whole loan CMOs are subject to both credit risk and interest rate risk. Issuers of whole loan CMOs generally structure their deals to reduce the credit risk of all certain classes of bonds ("Senior Bonds") by utilizing various forms of credit protection in the structure of the deal.

=== Credit tranching ===
The most common form of credit protection is called credit tranching. In the simplest case, credit tranching means that any credit losses will be absorbed by the most junior class of bondholders until the principal value of their investment reaches zero. If this occurs, the next class of bonds (more senior) absorb credit losses, and so forth, until finally the senior bonds begin to experience losses. More frequently, a deal is embedded with certain "triggers" related to quantities of delinquencies or defaults in the loans backing the mortgage pool. If a balance of delinquent loans reaches a certain threshold, interest and principal that would be used to pay junior bondholders is instead directed to pay off the principal balance of senior bondholders, shortening the life of the senior bonds.

=== Overcollateralization ===
In CMOs backed by loans of lower credit quality, such as subprime mortgage loans, the issuer will sell a quantity of bonds whose principal value is less than the value of the underlying pool of mortgages. Because of the excess collateral, investors in the CMO will not experience losses until defaults on the underlying loans reach a certain level.

If the "overcollateralization" turns into "undercollateralization" (the assumptions of the default rate were inadequate), then the CMO defaults. CMOs have contributed to the subprime mortgage crisis.

=== Excess spread ===
Another way to enhance credit protection is to issue bonds that pay a lower interest rate than the underlying mortgages. For example, if the weighted average interest rate of the mortgage pool is 7%, the CMO issuer could choose to issue bonds that pay a 5% coupon. The additional interest, referred to as "excess spread", is placed into a "spread account" until some or all of the bonds in the deal mature. If some of the mortgage loans go delinquent or default, funds from the excess spread account can be used to pay the bondholders. Excess spread is a very effective mechanism for protecting bondholders from defaults that occur late in the life of the deal because by that time the funds in the excess spread account will be sufficient to cover almost any losses.

== Prepayment tranching ==
The principal (and associated coupon) stream for CMO collateral can be structured to allocate prepayment risk. Investors in CMOs wish to be protected from prepayment risk as well as credit risk. Prepayment risk is the risk that the term of the security will vary according to differing rates of repayment of principal by borrowers (repayments from refinancings, sales, curtailments, or foreclosures). If principal is prepaid faster than expected (for example, if mortgage rates fall and borrowers refinance), then the overall term of the mortgage collateral will shorten, and the principal returned at par will cause a loss for premium priced collateral. This prepayment risk cannot be removed, but can be reallocated between CMO tranches so that some tranches have some protection against this risk, whereas other tranches will absorb more of this risk. To facilitate this allocation of prepayment risk, CMOs are structured such that prepayments are allocated between bonds using a fixed set of rules. The most common schemes for prepayment tranching are described below.

=== Sequential tranching (or by time) ===
All of the available principal payments go to the first sequential tranche, until its balance is decremented to zero, then to the second, and so on. There are several reasons that this type of tranching would be done:

- The tranches could be expected to mature at very different times and therefore would have different yields that correspond to different points on the yield curve.
- The underlying mortgages could have a great deal of uncertainty as to when the principal will actually be received since home owners have the option to make their scheduled payments or to pay their loan off early at any time. The sequential tranches each have much less uncertainty.

=== Parallel tranching ===
This simply means tranches that pay down pro rata. The coupons on the tranches would be set so that in aggregate the tranches pay the same amount of interest as the underlying mortgages. The tranches could be either fixed rate or floating rate. If they have floating coupons, they would have a formula that make their total interest equal to the collateral interest. For example, with collateral that pays a coupon of 8%, you could have two tranches that each have half of the principal, one being a floater that pays LIBOR with a cap of 16%, the other being an inverse floater that pays a coupon of 16% minus LIBOR.

- A special case of parallel tranching is known as the IO/PO split. IO and PO refer to Interest Only and Principal Only. In this case, one tranche would have a coupon of zero (meaning that it would get no interest at all) and the other would get all of the interest. These bonds could be used to speculate on prepayments. A principal only bond would be sold at a deep discount (a much lower price than the underlying mortgage) and would rise in price rapidly if many of the underlying mortgages were prepaid. The interest only bond would be very profitable if few of the mortgages prepaid, but could get very little money if many mortgages prepaid. Unlike sequential tranche securitization, an IO/PO split is a parallel tranche securitization in that each simply represents a separate claims on a different portion of the cash flows from the collateral pool (e.g. mortgages bonds). Unlike sequential tranche securitization, the payments to each tranche of a parallel securitization are not predicated on the prior payment to a more senior tranche of the pool. Absent any subordination of one tranche to the other, neither tranche of an IO/PO split (parallel securitization) would be deemed to be leveraged.

=== Z bonds ===
This type of tranche supports other tranches by not receiving an interest payment. The interest payment that would have accrued to the Z tranche is used to pay off the principal of other bonds, and the principal of the Z tranche increases. The Z tranche starts receiving interest and principal payments only after the other tranches in the CMO have been fully paid. This type of tranche is often used to customize sequential tranches, or VADM tranches.

=== Schedule bonds (also called PAC or TAC bonds) ===
This type of tranching has a bond (often called a PAC or TAC bond) which has even less uncertainty than a sequential bond by receiving prepayments according to a defined schedule. The schedule is maintained by using support bonds (also called companion bonds) that absorb the excess prepayments.

- Planned Amortization Class (PAC) bonds have a principal payment rate determined by two different prepayment rates, which together form a band (also called a collar). Early in the life of the CMO, the prepayment at the lower PSA will yield a lower prepayment. Later in the life, the principal in the higher PSA will have declined enough that it will yield a lower prepayment. The PAC tranche will receive whichever rate is lower, so it will change prepayment at one PSA for the first part of its life, then switch to the other rate. The ability to stay on this schedule is maintained by a support bond, which absorbs excess prepayments, and will receive less prepayments to prevent extension of average life. However, the PAC is only protected from extension to the amount that prepayments are made on the underlying MBSs. When the principal of that bond is exhausted, the CMO is referred to as a "busted PAC", or "busted collar".
- Target Amortization Class (TAC) bonds are similar to PAC bonds, but they do not provide protection against extension of average life. The schedule of principal payments is created by using just a single PSA.

=== Very accurately defined maturity (VADM) bonds ===
Very accurately defined maturity (VADM) bonds are similar to PAC bonds in that they protect against both extension and contraction risk, but their payments are supported in a different way. Instead of a support bond, they are supported by the accretion of a Z bond. This means a VADM tranche will receive the scheduled prepayments even if no prepayments are made on the underlying.

=== Non-accelerating senior (NAS) ===
NAS bonds are designed to protect investors from volatility and negative convexity resulting from prepayments. NAS tranches of bonds are fully protected from prepayments for a specified period, after which time prepayments are allocated to the tranche using a specified step down formula. For example, an NAS bond might be protected from prepayments for five years, and then would receive 10% of the prepayments for the first month, then 20%, and so on. Recently, issuers have added features to accelerate the proportion of prepayments flowing to the NAS class of bond in order to create shorter bonds and reduce extension risk. NAS tranches are usually found in deals that also contain short sequentials, Z-bonds, and credit subordination. A NAS tranche receives principal payments according to a schedule which shows for a given month the share of pro rata principal that must be distributed to the NAS tranche.

=== NASquential ===
NASquentials were introduced in mid-2005 and represented an innovative structural twist, combining the standard NAS (Non-Accelerated Senior) and Sequential structures. Similar to a sequential structure, the NASquentials are tranched sequentially, however, each tranche has a NAS-like hard lockout date associated with it. Unlike with a NAS, no shifting interest mechanism is employed after the initial lockout date. The resulting bonds offer superior stability versus regular sequentials, and yield pickup versus PACs. The support-like cashflows falling out on the other side of NASquentials are sometimes referred to as RUSquentials (Relatively Unstable Sequentials).

== Coupon tranching ==
The coupon stream from the mortgage collateral can also be restructured (analogous to the way the principal stream is structured). This coupon stream allocation is performed after prepayment tranching is complete. If the coupon tranching is done on the collateral without any prepayment tranching, then the resulting tranches are called 'strips'. The benefit is that the resulting CMO tranches can be targeted to very different sets of investors. In general, coupon tranching will produce a pair (or set) of complementary CMO tranches.

=== IO/discount fixed rate pair ===
A fixed rate CMO tranche can be further restructured into an Interest Only (IO) tranche and a discount coupon fixed rate tranche. An IO pays a coupon only based on a notional principal, it receives no principal payments from amortization or prepayments. Notional principal does not have any cash flows but shadows the principal changes of the original tranche, and it is this principal off which the coupon is calculated. For example, a $100mm PAC tranche off 6% collateral with a 6% coupon ('6 off 6' or '6-squared') can be cut into a $100mm PAC tranche with a 5% coupon (and hence a lower dollar price) called a '5 off 6', and a PAC IO tranche with a notional principal of $16.666667mm and paying a 6% coupon. Note the resulting notional principle of the IO is less than the original principal. Using the example, the IO is created by taking 1% of coupon off the 6% original coupon gives an IO of 1% coupon off $100mm notional principal, but this is by convention 'normalized' to a 6% coupon (as the collateral was originally 6% coupon) by reducing the notional principal to $16.666667mm ($100mm / 6).

=== PO/premium fixed rate pair ===
Similarly if a fixed rate CMO tranche coupon is desired to be increased, then principal can be removed to form a Principal Only (PO) class and a premium fixed rate tranche. A PO pays no coupon, but receives principal payments from amortization and prepayments. For example, a $100mm sequential (SEQ) tranche off 6% collateral with a 6% coupon ('6 off 6') can be cut into a $92.307692mm SEQ tranche with a 6.5% coupon (and hence a higher dollar price) called a '6.5 off 6', and a SEQ PO tranche with a principal of $7.692308mm and paying a no coupon. The principal of the premium SEQ is calculated as (6 / 6.5) * $100mm, the principal of the PO is calculated as balance from $100mm.

=== IO/PO pair ===
The simplest coupon tranching is to allocate the coupon stream to an IO, and the principal stream to a PO. This is generally only done on the whole collateral without any prepayment tranching, and generates strip IOs and strip POs. In particular FNMA and FHLMC both have extensive strip IO/PO programs (aka Trusts IO/PO or SMBS) which generate very large, liquid strip IO/PO deals at regular intervals.

=== Floater/inverse pair ===
The construction of CMO Floaters is the most effective means of getting additional market liquidity for CMOs. CMO floaters have a coupon that moves in line with a given index (usually 1 month LIBOR) plus a spread, and is thus seen as a relatively safe investment even though the term of the security may change. One feature of CMO floaters that is somewhat unusual is that they have a coupon cap, usually set well out of the money (e.g. 8% when LIBOR is 5%) In creating a CMO floater, a CMO Inverse is generated. The CMO inverse is a more complicated instrument to hedge and analyse, and is usually sold to sophisticated investors.

The construction of a floater/inverse can be seen in two stages. The first stage is to synthetically raise the effective coupon to the target floater cap, in the same way as done for the PO/Premium fixed rate pair. As an example using $100mm 6% collateral, targeting an 8% cap, we generate $25mm of PO and $75mm of '8 off 6'. The next stage is to cut up the premium coupon into a floater and inverse coupon, where the floater is a linear function of the index, with unit slope and a given offset or spread. In the example, the 8% coupon of the '8 off 6' is cut into a floater coupon of:

$$1 \times \text{LIBOR} + 0.40\%$$

(indicating a 0.40%, or 40bps, spread in this example)

The inverse formula is simply the difference of the original premium fixed rate coupon less the floater formula. In the example:

$$8\% - \left(1\times\text{LIBOR} + 0.40\%\right) = 7.60\% - 1\times\text{LIBOR}$$

The floater coupon is allocated to the premium fixed rate tranche principal, in the example the $75mm '8 off 6', giving the floater tranche of '$75mm 8% cap + 40bps LIBOR SEQ floater'. The floater will pay LIBOR + 0.40% each month on an original balance of $75mm, subject to a coupon cap of 8%.

The inverse coupon is to be allocated to the PO principal, but has been generated of the notional principal of the premium fixed rate tranche (in the example the PO principal is $25mm but the inverse coupon is notionalized off $75mm). Therefore, the inverse coupon is 're-notionalized' to the smaller principal amount, in the example this is done by multiplying the coupon by ($75mm /$25mm) = 3. Therefore, the resulting coupon is:

$$3\times \left(7.60\% - 1\times\text{LIBOR}\right) = 22.8\% - 3\times\text{LIBOR}$$

In the example the inverse generated is a '$25mm 3 times levered 7.6 strike LIBOR SEQ inverse'.

=== Other structures ===
Other structures include Inverse IOs, TTIBs, Digital TTIBs/Superfloaters, and 'mountain' bonds. A special class of IO/POs generated in non-agency deals are WAC IOs and WAC POs, which are used to build a fixed pass through rate on a deal.

== Attributes of IOs and POs ==
=== Interest only (IO) ===
An interest only (IO) tranche may be carved from collateral securities to receive just the interest payments from a pool of mortgages. IO holders are only entitled to the actual amount of interest paid, as it is paid, on a pool of mortgage collateral. Since mortgages allow for prepayment, there is no assurance how much interest will actually be paid. Once all an underlying debt is paid off, that debt's future stream of interest is terminated and the IO expires with no terminal value. Therefore, IO securities are annuity-like securities but the amount and timing of payments is uncertain as payments are based on the total interest payments paid on all the underlying mortgages in the collateral pool.

Generally speaking, mortgage prepayments tend to slow down as general interest rates increase. Therefore, IOs prices generally increase as interest rates increase and decrease as interest rates decrease (i.e. negative duration). If mortgage prepayments increase, or the market's expectations of future prepayments increases (i.e. higher expected PSA speed), the expected aggregate dollar amount of interest payments [and therefore the market price of the IO tranche] would generally be expected to decrease. By contrast, if mortgage prepayments decrease, or the market's expectations of future prepayments decreases (i.e. lower expected PSA speed), the expected dollar amount of interest payments [and therefore the market price of the IO tranche] would generally be expected to increase.

Therefore, IOs have investor demand due to their expected negative effective duration as they can be used as a hedge against conventional fixed-income securities in a portfolio. Additionally, since investors are only buying a portion of the overall cash flows and are not entitled to any payments of principal (the PO tranche), the cost of the IO trance may be significantly lower than that of the PO tranche. While IO and PO tranches have different risk characteristics, neither the IO nor the PO represents a leveraged position in the underlying collateral pool.

=== Principal only (PO) ===
A principal only (PO) strip may be carved from collateral securities to receive just the principal portion of a payment. Since the IO tranche has negative duration, a PO typically has more effective duration than its collateral. One may think of this in two ways: 1. The increased effective duration must balance the matching IO's negative effective duration to equal the collateral's effective duration, or 2. Bonds with lower coupons usually have higher effective durations, and a PO has no [zero] coupon. POs have investor demand as hedges against IO-type streams (e.g. mortgage servicing rights).

== See also ==
- Asset-backed security
- Collateralized debt obligation (CDO)
- Collateralized fund obligation (CFO)
- Collateralized loan obligation (CLO)
- GNMA
- Mortgage-backed security
- Real estate mortgage investment conduit
