= MEPA =

MEPA may refer to:

- Malta Environment and Planning Authority
- Medium Energy Particle Analyzer, an experiment on the AMPTE-CCE NASA satellite
- Montana Environmental Policy Act, a law in the U.S. state of Montana; see Held v. Montana
- Multi-Ethnic Placement Act
