= Commitment rate =

Commitment rates are the rates at which mortgage loans can be sold to another entity, such as Fannie Mae and Freddie Mac or other lenders. The Fannie Mae Commitment Rate is the rate that Fannie requires for a par-priced loan. From the commitment rate, Fannie extracts its guarantee fee (which has tended to average around 19bp). The remaining interest goes to the secondary market investor. So, the Fannie Mae Commitment Rate is loosely the sum of the Fannie Mae current-coupon rate and Fannie Mae's guarantee fee.

They, with the characteristics of loan pool, can be input to mortgage prepayment model.
