= RMBS =

RMBS may refer to:

- Residential mortgage-backed security
- Royal Marines Band Service
- Rambus, ticker symbol
