= Mortgage servicing rights =

Contractual right to service a mortgage loan

In the mortgage industry of the United States, mortgage servicing rights (MSR) are the contractual rights to service a mortgage after the mortgage origination process is complete. Mortgage servicing is the management of the repayment of mortgage debt on behalf of the lender, including the collection and recording of mortgage payments. The legal entity that holds the mortgage servicing rights is the mortgage servicer.

The initial holder of servicing rights is the mortgage lender (the creditor). These rights are a transferable asset; they may be bought and sold on the secondary mortgage market.

== Overview ==
The mortgage loan and the legal rights to service that loan are two distinct financial instruments. After mortgage origination, the mortgage lender may elect to sell one or both of them, each independently of the other, on the secondary mortgage market.

The mortgage servicer is responsible for collecting mortgage payments and managing escrow accounts. When a borrower makes a mortgage payment, some of the payment applies to the principal balance, and some to interest. The servicer forwards these proceeds to the mortgage holder for a servicing fee.

The servicer may further capitalize on the MSR by charging servicing fees and ancillary fees to borrowers. Float income (a form of interest) is another source of revenue:

Servicing fees
These are fees charged to the borrower (the mortgagor). The mortgage servicer may assess them at a fixed percentage (25 to 50 basis points) of the unpaid principal balance (UPB).
Ancillary fees
These include late payment penalties and fees for processing loan payoffs.
Float income
Interest earned on funds temporarily held in escrow (taxes and insurance) before they are disbursed.

== Financial characteristics ==
MSR are unique among fixed income assets in that their cash flows depend heavily on borrower behavior and interest rates.

=== Negative duration and convexity ===
Unlike most bonds, MSRs will often exhibit "negative duration". When interest rates rise, the value of an MSR typically increases. This occurs because higher rates reduce the incentive for homeowners to refinance, thereby extending the expected life of the mortgage and the duration of the servicing fee stream. Conversely, when rates fall, prepayment activity tends to increase, shortening the life of the asset and decreasing its value.

MSRs are also characterized by significant "negative convexity". As interest rates decline, the rate of prepayment changes non-linearly. This creates an effective "price ceiling" on the asset; the faster the prepayments, the more the future servicing revenue is extinguished, leading to a sharp decline in the asset's net present value (NPV).

== Accounting and regulatory treatment ==
=== Level 3 asset status ===
Under ASC 820 (Fair Value Management), MSRs are classified as "level 3 assets". This classification is reserved for financial assets with "unobservable inputs" that are significant to the overall fair value measurement.

Because MSRs do not trade on a public exchange, their valuation typically relies on internal management assumptions or models. Relevant valuation components could include the effect of inflation on servicing costs, statistical models (e.g., to project the rates of prepayment and default activity), an option adjusted spread, and a discount rate methodology.

=== Capital treatment (Basel III) ===
For depository institutions, MSRs are subject to stringent capital requirements. Under the U.S. implementation of Basel III, MSRs are assigned a 250% risk-weighted asset (RWA) multiplier for any amount not deducted from capital under the 10%/15% threshold rules.

== Risk management and hedging ==
Because MSRs are highly sensitive to interest rate volatility, financial institutions typically manage them as part of a "macro hedge" or a dedicated "MSR hedging" strategy. The objective is the protect the asset's NPV against changes in the yield curve and prepayment expectations.

=== The "natural hedge" ===
For firms that both originate and service mortgages, MSRs act as a "natural hedge". During periods of rising interest rates, mortgage production (origination) revenue typically declines as consumer demand for new loans drops, while on the other hand MSR values increase because the existing portfolio's expected life extends due to the lower prepayment speeds, thus generating more fee income over time.

=== Active hedging instruments ===
Because the "natural hedge" is rarely a perfect offset, and because many servicers do not have origination platforms, firms use financial derivatives to manage the asset's risk profile.

- Duration hedging: servicers use interest rate swaps, Treasury futures, and Eurodollar futures to offset the MSR's negative duration. Since the MSR's value moves in the same direction as rates, a servicer will typically take short positions in these instruments.
- Convexity hedging: because MSRs have significant negative convexity, the duration itself changes as rates moves. To manage this risk, firms use interest rate swaptions or MBS options to provide protection against rapid, non-linear rate movements.
- Basis risk: servicers must also manage the risk that the spread between the hedging instrument (e.g., SOFR swaps) and the mortgage rate (which drives prepayments) may widen or narrow unexpectedly.

=== Hedge accounting ===
Under ASC 815 (Derivatives and Hedging), firms may apply hedge accounting to reduce earnings volatility. However, many MSR holders instead elect the "fair value option" for the MSR asset itself under ASC 860. This allows the changes in the value of the MSR to naturally offset the changes in the value of the derivatives on the income statement without the strict documentation requirements of formal hedge accounting.

== Information asymmetry in MSR transfers ==
In the secondary mortgage market, the sale of MSRs is characterized by significant information asymmetry between the mortgage originator (the agent) and the MSR purchaser (the principal). While originators disclose quantitative "hard information" (such as credit scores and debt-to-income ratios) to the buyer, they are not required to disclose proprietary "soft information" regarding borrower reliability and local economic conditions gathered during initial underwriting.

This discrepancy facilitates a "second stage" adverse selection problem. Because the cost of servicing a mortgage increases dramatically during delinquency (due to the labor-intensive requirements of loss mitigation, payment collection, and foreclosure management), originators are financially incentivized to strategically divest the MSR associated with loans having a higher latent probability of default.

By using private data to identify and offload these high-risk assets, the originating institution effectively externalizes credit and operational risk, shifting the legal and administrative burdens of distressed assets to the new servicer. Conversely, the originator protects its own profitability by retaining "low-touch" MSRs for high-quality loans, which yield steady fee income with minimal overhead.

== Financial Stability Oversight Council Report (2024) ==
In May 2024, the Financial Stability Oversight Council (FSOC) issued a report identifying systemic risks associated with the concentration of MSRs among non-bank mortgage companies, which represented 54% of the market by 2023. The council noted that the high sensitivity of MSR valuations to interest rate changes, combined with a lack of stable liquidity, could lead to widespread disruption in the event of a major servicer failing. To mitigate these risks, the report recommended that the United States Congress grant federal regulators expanded authority to set safety and soundness standards and establish an industry-funded liquidity backstop to ensure the continuous processing of borrower payments.

== See also ==
- Loan servicing
- Mortgage servicer
- Prepayment of loan
- Real estate investment trust
