= United States ex rel. Szymoniak v. American Home Mortgage Servicing =

United States of America, ex rel., Lynn E. Szymoniak v. American Home Mortgage Servicing, Inc. was a qui tam whistleblower lawsuit filed in the United States District Court for the District of South Carolina that resulted in a $95 million settlement in 2012 regarding mortgage foreclosure practices.

== Background ==
The case was filed as a qui tam action under the False Claims Act by Lynn E. Szymoniak, a Florida attorney and forensic fraud investigator who worked as a realtor and had personal experience with foreclosure proceedings. Szymoniak alleged widespread mortgage foreclosure fraud by major mortgage servicing companies.

The lawsuit centered on practices related to foreclosure documentation, including allegations that mortgage servicer submitted false affidavits and documents to courts in foreclosure proceedings. The case was part of broader scrutiny of mortgage servicing practices following the 2008 financial crisis.

== Allegations ==
The qui tam complaint alleged that mortgage servicers engaged in systematic practices that violated the False Claims Act, including:

- Submission of false affidavits in foreclosure proceedings
- Use of "robo-signing" practices where employees signed thousands of foreclosure documents without proper review or personal knowledge
- Filing of fraudulent mortgage assignments and other documents with courts
- Making false certifications regarding document review and verification processes

== Settlement ==
In 2012, the case was resolved as part of a $95 million settlement with the nation's five largest mortgage servicers. The settlement partially resolved the South Carolina False Claims Act lawsuit and was part of broader settlements addressing mortgage servicing practices across multiple states.

Under the False Claims Act's qui tam provisions, whistleblowers who bring successful cases are entitled to receive a percentage of the recovery. The settlement addressed allegations that the servicing companies had filed false claims for reimbursement of foreclosure costs.

== Significance ==
The case was significant as:

- One of several qui tam actions that exposed widespread problems in mortgage servicing and foreclosure practices following the 2008 financial crisis
- An example of False Claims Act enforcement in the mortgage servicing context
- Part of coordinated federal and state enforcement actions addressing foreclosure documentation practices

The litigation contributed to broader reforms in mortgage servicing standards and increased scrutiny of foreclosure documentation practices. It demonstrated how qui tam provisions of the False Claims Act could be applied to mortgage servicing operations involving government-insured or government-backed mortgages.

The case was handled by multiple law firms representing the relator, including Janet, Janet & Suggs.

== See also ==
- False Claims Act
- Qui tam
- Mortgage servicing
- Subprime mortgage crisis
