= Mortgage yield =

In finance, mortgage yield is a measure of the yield of mortgage-backed bonds. It is also known as cash flow yield. The mortgage yield, or cash flow yield, of a mortgage-backed bond is the monthly compounded discount rate at which the net present value of all future cash flows from the bond will be equal to the present price of the bond.

== Formula ==
When the coupon payments are made on a monthly basis, the mortgage yield can be calculated as:

$$\mbox{Mortgage Yield: ri such that P} = \sum_{n=1}^{N} \frac{C(t)}{(1+ri/1200)^{t-1}}$$

Where

t - the time of the cash flow
n - each instance of coupon payment
r - the discount rate
$C(t)$ - the net cash flow (the amount of cash) at time t.

== Application ==
Mortgage yields are primarily a tool for comparing mortgage bonds with conventional bonds. The difference between the mortgage-backed bond's yield (generally converted to semi-annually compounded yield to maturity) and a conventional bond is called the "yield spread" or "I-spread."
