= Constant maturity =

Constant maturity refers to have a fixed (constant) maturity. It may refer to:

- Constant maturity credit default swap
- Constant maturity mortgage
- Constant maturity swap
- Constant-maturity treasury
