= Russian mortgage certificate =

According to the Russian legislation, a Russian Mortgage Certificate (Russian: Закладная) is a security that verifies its holder’s right to real estate pledged as a security for a mortgage loan. As nearly elsewhere, Russian Mortgage Certificates are often used as underlying asset and collateral for securities issued and sold to investors in the course of securitisation. The above-mentioned securities are often called RMBS - Residential Mortgage Backed Securities. Any interested buyers or investors can:

1. either buy Russian Mortgage Certificates directly from their current holders which are often primary lenders
2. or they can buy RMBS collateralized with the Certificates as underlying assets.

The appropriate Russian law N 102 ФЕДЕРАЛЬНЫЙ ЗАКОН ОБ ИПОТЕКЕ called Federal Mortgage Law was passed on 16.07.1998. This law regulates mortgage lending issues including definition and mandatory parameters of Russian Mortgage Certificate.

It is possible to download the more or less standardized template from the site of the Russian State Agency carrying functions similar to those of Fannie Mae, Freddie Mac or Ginnie Mae in USA.
