= Dollar roll =

A dollar roll is similar to a reverse repurchase agreement and provides a form of collateralized short-term financing with mortgage-backed securities comprising the collateral. The investor sells a mortgage-backed security for settlement on one date and buys it back for settlement at a later date. The investor gives up the principal and interest payments during the roll period, but can invest the proceeds and usually is able to buy back the mortgage for a lower price than the sale price. The difference in the prices is called the drop, which is usually priced between SIFMA settlement dates. The value of the drop plus interest earned on the proceeds of the sale less the forgone interest and principal payments on the mortgage, is considered the roll specialness or financing advantage. With repurchase agreements exactly the same security is returned to the investor, while with dollar rolls the investor buys a substantially similar—but not necessarily identical—security. This difference produces complex results under certain areas of the United States Internal Revenue Code.

Dollar rolls help investors achieve various objectives, such as staying invested in mortgages while earning a trading spread. Likewise, if an investor faces operational or delivery obstacles with respect to a certain mortgage-backed security, a dollar roll may help the investor retain the economic exposure while avoiding the operational difficulties.

== See also ==
- Constant Maturity Mortgage
