= Small Business Job Protection Act of 1996 =

1996 US federal law

- Long title: An Act to provide tax relief for small businesses, to protect jobs, to create opportunities, to increase the take-home pay of workers, to amend the Portal-to-Portal Act of 1947 relating to the payment of wages to employees who use employer-owned vehicles, and to amend the Fair Labor Standards Act of 1938 to increase the minimum wage rate and to prevent job loss by providing flexibility to employers in complying with such Act.
- Enacted by: the 104th United States Congress

Citations
- Public law: Pub. L. 104-188
- Statutes at Large: 110 Stat. 1755

Legislative history
- Introduced in the House as H.R. 3448 by Bill Archer on May 14, 1996; Signed into law by President Bill Clinton on August 20, 1996

The Small Business Job Protection Act of 1996 (Pub. L. 104–188 (text) (PDF), H.R. 3448, 110 Stat. 1755, enacted August 20, 1996) is a United States federal law. It was sponsored by Rep. Bill Archer (R-TX) and it was signed into law by President Bill Clinton.

The stated intent of the bill is:

"To provide tax relief for small businesses, to protect jobs, to create opportunities, to increase the take home pay of workers, to amend the Portal-to-Portal Act of 1947 relating to the payment of wages to employees who use employer owned vehicles, and to amend the Fair Labor Standards Act of 1938 to increase the minimum wage rate and to prevent job loss by providing flexibility to employers in complying with minimum wage and overtime requirements under that Act."

== Effects ==
=== 401(k) ===
The Act created a simplified 401(k) retirement plan to make it easier for small businesses to offer pension plans to their employees.

=== Adoption ===
A nonrefundable tax credit of up to $5,000 per child for adoption expenses and $6,000 for children with special needs was established.

Entitled "Removal of Barriers to Interethnic Adoption," the portion is known as the Interethnic Placement Act (or IEPA). Its amendments strengthened and clarified the Multi-Ethnic Placement Act of 1994 (also known as MEPA).

IEPA eliminated some unclear language in MEPA about cultural considerations in the foster care and adoption processes. IEPA's primary purpose was to eliminate racial discrimination during federally-funded foster care and adoption placements so that children will not be delayed or denied placement based on their race, color, or national origin. The protection against discrimination also extends to foster and adoptive parents. IEPA established financial penalties for states that do not comply with these provisions. IEPA also reiterated MEPA's requirement that agencies need to recruit more racially diverse foster and adoptive parents to reflect the diverse children in need of placements.

=== Capital expense ===
The maximum amount claimed for capital expenses allowed by small businesses was increased by $7,000. The full amount was phased in over time.

=== Education tax incentive ===
Small businesses were allowed to exclude as much as $5,250 from an employee's taxable income for educational assistance provided by the employer until May 1997.

=== Repeal of Section 956A IRC Code ===
The Act repealed IRC Code (1994) Section 956A. The section had hitherto limited the ability of multinationals to avoid repatriation by imposing current taxation rates on excess passive assets held abroad.

=== Minimum wage ===
The Act increased minimum wage in two steps, from $4.25 per hour to $4.75 effective October 1, 1996, then to $5.15 on September 1, 1997.

=== Research Tax Credit ===
The research Tax Credit had expired on July 1, 1995. It extended the credit through May 1997 but was not retroactive.

=== Work Opportunity Tax Credit ===
The Targeted Jobs Tax Credit was replaced with the Work opportunity tax credit.

=== FASITs ===
Section 1621 created the financial asset securitization investment trust (FASIT), a type of special purpose entity used for securitization of any debt and issuance of asset-backed securities. In the Enron scandal, Enron used FASITs to avoid Subpart F rules on foreign income, and because of their inherent abuse potential, were repealed under section 835 of the American Jobs Creation Act of 2004.

=== S Corporation Shareholders ===
Sections 1301-1317 dealt specifically with rules governing S Corporations. Effective January 1, 1998, Section 1316 of the Act permitted certain tax exempt organizations to be shareholders in an S corporation.
