= Pool factor =

In finance, a pool factor is the amount of the initial principal of the underlying mortgage loans that remain in a mortgage-backed security transaction. It is expressed as a factor of one that is used to indicate the remaining principal balance. Pool factors are only used to describe specific classes of securities, namely pooled asset-backed securities (ABSs) and mortgage-backed securities (MBSs) whose component payments are returned to investors on a monthly basis. Pool factors are published monthly in the US for Ginnie Mae, Fannie Mae, and Freddie Mac mortgage-backed securities.

== Calculation ==
To calculate the pool factor,

${Outstanding Principal Balance\over Original Principal Balance} = {Pool Factor}$

For example, a pool factor of 0.523 indicates that for each note of $10,000, $4,770 of principal has been repaid. If one multiplies the original face value of mortgage back security with the pool factor, we get the current face value.

== Usage ==
Asset-backed securities and MBSs typically contain issue terms that specify a method through which redeeming principal is shared among investors. When redemption is done pro-rata, a pool factor is useful to investors in cases of early repayment. Early repayment reduces the amount of collateral available for an issue, and therefore some of the outstanding principal is returned to investors as stated in the issue terms. In this case, the pool factor is used to indicate how the remaining outstanding principal is adequately securitized.
