= Real estate mortgage investment conduit =

Investment security issuing business

A real estate mortgage investment conduit (REMIC) is a business entity that issues investment securities representing interests in a portfolio of mortgages. Under U.S. Federal income tax law a REMIC can qualify for treatment as a partnership, with tax payable by investors rather than the entity. REMICs are used for the pooling of mortgage loans and issuance of mortgage-backed securities and have been a key contributor to the success of the mortgage-backed securities market over the past several decades.

The federal income taxation of REMICs is governed primarily under 26 U.S.C. §§ 860A–860G of Part IV of Subchapter M of Chapter 1 of Subtitle A of the Internal Revenue Code (26 U.S.C.). To qualify as a REMIC, an organization makes an "election" to do so by filing a Form 1066 with the Internal Revenue Service, and by meeting certain other requirements. They were authorized by the Tax Reform Act of 1986 and introduced in 1987 as the typical vehicle for the securitization of residential mortgages in the United States.

== REMIC usage ==
REMICs are investment vehicles that hold commercial and residential mortgages in trust and issue securities representing an undivided interest in these mortgages. A REMIC assembles mortgages into pools and issues pass-through certificates, multiclass bonds similar to a collateralized mortgage obligation (CMO), or other securities to investors in the secondary mortgage market. Mortgage-backed securities issued through a REMIC can be debt financings of the issuer or a sale of assets. Legal form is irrelevant to REMICs: trusts, corporations, and partnerships may all elect to have REMIC status, and even pools of assets that are not legal entities may qualify as REMICs.

The Tax Reform Act eliminated the double taxation of income earned at the corporate level by an issuer and dividends paid to securities holders, thereby allowing a REMIC to structure a mortgage-backed securities offering as a sale of assets, effectively removing the loans from the originating lender's balance sheet, rather than a debt financing in which the loans remain as balance sheet assets (as is the case for covered bonds). A REMIC itself is exempt from federal taxes, although income earned by investors is fully taxable. As REMICs are typically exempt from tax at the entity level, they may invest only in qualified mortgages and permitted investments, including single family or multifamily mortgages, commercial mortgages, second mortgages, mortgage participations, and federal agency pass-through securities. Nonmortgage assets, such as credit card receivables, leases, and auto loans are ineligible investments. The Tax Reform Act made it easier for savings institutions and real estate investment trusts to hold mortgage securities as qualified portfolio investments. A savings institution, for instance, can include REMIC-issued mortgage-backed securities as qualifying assets in meeting federal requirements for treatment as a savings and loan for tax purposes.

To qualify as a REMIC, an entity or pool of assets must make a REMIC election, follow certain rules as to composition of assets (by holding qualified mortgages and permitted investments), adopt reasonable methods to prevent disqualified organizations from holding its residual interests, and structure investors' interests as any number of classes of regular interests and one – and only one – class of residual interests. The Internal Revenue Code does not appear to require REMICs to have a class of regular interests.

=== Pooling and servicing agreement (PSA) ===
A pooling and servicing agreement (PSA) is generally incorporated into each REMIC. A PSA is the legal document that defines the rights and obligations of the mortgage servicer, the trustee, and other parties over a pool of securitized mortgage loans. A typical PSA is worded, in part, as follows: "As promptly as practicable after any transfer of a Mortgage Loan under this Agreement, and in any event within thirty days after the transfer, the Trustee shall (i) affix the Trustee's name to each assignment of Mortgage, as its assignee, and (ii) cause to be delivered for recording in the appropriate public office for real property records the assignments of the Mortgages to the Trustee,"

=== Qualified mortgages ===
Qualified mortgages encompass several types of obligations and interests. Qualified mortgages are defined as "(1) any obligation (including any participation or certificate of beneficial ownership therein) which is principally secured by an interest in real property, and is either transferred to the REMIC on the startup day in exchange for regular or residual interests, or purchased within three months after the startup day pursuant to a fixed-price contract in effect on the startup day, (2) any regular interest in another REMIC which is transferred to the REMIC on the startup day in exchange for regular or residual interests in the REMIC, (3) any qualified replacement mortgage, or (4) certain FASIT regular interests." In (1), "obligation" is ambiguous; a broad reading would include contract claims but a narrower reading would involve only what would qualify as "debt obligations" under the Code. The IRC defines "principally secured" as either having "substantially all of the proceeds of the obligation ... used to acquire or to improve or protect an interest in real property that, at the origination date, is the only security for the obligation" or having a fair market value of the interest that secures the obligation be at least 80% of the adjusted issue price (usually the amount that is loaned to the mortgagor) or be at least that amount when contributed to the REMIC.

=== Prohibited assignments to REMICs ===
"As trust documents are explicit in setting forth a method and date for the transfer of the mortgage loans to the trust and in insisting that no party involved in the trust take steps that would endanger the trust's REMIC status, if the original transfers did not comply with the method and timing for transfer required by the trust documents, then such belated transfers to the trust would be void." "If the trust is expressed in the instrument creating the estate of the trustee, every sale, conveyance or other act of the trustee in contravention of the trust, except as authorized by this article and by any other provision of law, is void."

=== Permitted investments ===
Permitted investments include cash flow investments, qualified reserve assets, and foreclosure property.

Cash flow investments are temporary investments in passive assets that earn interest (as opposed to accruing dividends, for example) of the payments on qualified mortgages that occur between the time that the REMIC receives the payments and the REMIC's distribution of that money to its holders. Qualifying payments include mortgage payments of principal or interest, payments on credit enhancement contracts, profits from disposing of mortgages, funds from foreclosure properties, payments for warranty breaches on mortgages, and prepayment penalties.

Qualified reserve assets are forms of intangible property other than residual interests in REMICs that are held as investments as part of a qualified reserve fund, which "is any reasonably required reserve to provide for full payment of" a REMIC's costs or payments to interest holders due to default, unexpectedly low returns, or deficits in interest from prepayments. REMICs usually opt for safe, short term investments with low yields, so it is typically desirable to minimize the reserve fund while maintaining "the desired credit quality for the REMIC interests."

Foreclosure property is real property that REMICs obtain upon defaults. After obtaining foreclosure properties, REMICs have until the end of the third year to dispose of them, although the IRS sometimes grants extensions. Foreclosure property loses its status if a lease creates certain kinds of rent income, if construction activities that did not begin before the REMIC acquired the property are undertaken, or if the REMIC uses the property in a trade or business without the use of an independent contractor and over 90 days after acquiring it.

=== Regular interests ===
A REMIC may include any number of classes of regular interests; these are often identified by letters such as "A" class, "B" class, etc., and are assigned a coupon rate and the terms of payment. It is useful to think of regular interests as resembling debt; they tend to have lower risk with a corresponding lower yield. Regular interests are taxed as debt. A regular interest must be designated as such, be issued on the startup day, contain fixed terms, provide for interest payments and how they are payable, and unconditionally entitle the holder of the interest to receive a specific amount of the principal. Profits are taxed to holders.

=== Residual interests ===
A REMIC can have only one class of residual interest. Residual interests tend to involve ownership and resemble equity more than debt. However, residual interests may be neither debt nor equity. "For example, if a REMIC is a segregated pool of assets within a legal entity, the residual interest could consist of (1) the rights of ownership of the REMIC's assets, subject to the claims of regular interest holders, or (2) if the regular interests take the form of debt secured under an indenture, a contractual right to receive distributions released from the lien of the indenture." The risk is greater, as residual interest holders are the last to be paid, but the potential gains are greater. Residual interests must be designated as such, be issued on the startup day, and not be a regular interest (which it can effortlessly avoid by not being designated as a regular interest). If the REMIC makes a distribution to residual interest holders, it must be pro rata; the pro rata requirement simplifies matters because it usually prevents a residual class from being treated as multiple classes, which could disqualify the REMIC.

=== Re-REMIC ===
During the 2008 financial crisis, the ratings of many REMICs collapsed. To extract some higher ratings for regulatory risk-capital purposes, several REMICs were turned into re-securitized real estate mortgage investment conduits (re-REMICs). In a simple re-REMIC, an investor transfers ownership of mortgage-backed securities to a new special purpose entity; by transferring a sufficient amount of assets to the new structure, the new structure's tranches may receive a higher rating (e.g., an "AAA" rating). However, a number of re-REMICs have subsequently seen their new AAA ratings reduced to CCC.

== Forms ==
A REMIC can issue mortgage securities in a wide variety of forms: securities collateralized by Government National Mortgage Association (Ginnie Mae) pass-through certificates, whole loans, single class participation certificates and multiclass mortgage-backed securities; multiple class pass-through securities and multiclass mortgage-backed securities; multiple class pass-through securities with fast-pay or slow-pay features; securities with a subordinated debt tranche that assumes most of the default risk, allowing the issuer to get a better credit rating; and Collateralized Mortgage Obligations with monthly pass-through of bond interest, eliminating reinvestment risk by giving investors call protection against early repayment.

== The advantages of REMICs ==
REMICs abolish many of the inefficiencies of collateralized mortgage obligations (CMOs) and offer issuers more options and greater flexibility. REMICs have no minimum equity requirements, so REMICs can sell all of their assets rather than retain some to meet collateralization requirements. Since regular interests automatically qualify as debt, REMICs also avoid the awkward reinvestment risk that CMO issuers bear to indicate debt. REMICs also may make monthly distributions to investors where CMOs make quarterly payments. REMIC residual interests enjoy more liquidity than owner's trusts, which restrict equity interest and personal liability transfers. REMICs offer more flexibility than CMOs, as issuers can choose any legal entity and type of securities. The REMIC's multiple-class capabilities also permit issuers to offer different servicing priorities along with varying maturity dates, lowering default risks and reducing the need for credit enhancement. REMICs are also fairly user-friendly, as the REMIC election is not difficult, and the extensive guidance in the Code and in the regulations offers "a high degree of certainty with respect to tax treatment that may not be available for other types of MBSs".

== The limitations of REMICs ==
Though REMICs provide relief from entity-level taxation, their allowable activities are quite limited "to holding a fixed pool of mortgages and distributing payments currently to investors". A REMIC has some freedom to substitute qualified mortgages, declare bankruptcy, deal with foreclosures and defaults, dispose of and substitute defunct mortgages, prevent defaults on regular interests, prepay regular interests when the costs exceed the value of maintaining those interests, and undergo a qualified liquidation, in which the REMIC has 90 days to sell its assets and distribute cash to its holders. All other transactions are considered to be prohibited activities and are subject to a penalty tax of 100%, as are all nonqualifying contributions.

To avoid the 100% contributions tax, contributions to REMICs must be made on the startup day. However, cash contributions avoid this tax if they are given three months after the startup day, involve a clean-up call or qualified liquidation, are made as a guarantee, or are contributed by a residual interest holder to a qualified reserve fund. Additionally, states may tax REMICs under state tax laws. "Many states have adopted whole or partial tax exemptions for entities that qualify as REMICs under federal law."

REMICs are subject to federal income taxes at the highest corporate rate for foreclosure income and must file returns through Form 1066. The foreclosure income that is taxable is the same as that for a real estate investment trust (REIT) and may include rents contingent on making a profit, rents paid by a related party, rents from property to which the REMIC offers atypical services, and income from foreclosed property when the REMIC serves as dealer.

The REMIC rules in some ways exacerbate problems of phantom income for residual interest holders, which occurs when taxable gain must be realized without a corresponding economic gain with which to pay the tax. Phantom income arises by virtue of the way that the tax rules are written. There are penalties for transferring income to non-taxpayers, so REMIC interest holders must pay taxes on gains that they do not yet have.

== Major issuers of REMICs ==
Among the major issuers of REMICs are the Federal Home Loan Mortgage Corporation (Freddie Mac) and the Federal National Mortgage Association (Fannie Mae), the two leading secondary market buyers of conventional mortgage loans, as well as privately operated mortgage conduits owned by mortgage bankers, mortgage insurance companies, and savings institutions.

== History ==
REMICs were first authorized by the Tax Reform Act of 1986 (the second round of the Reagan tax cuts). They were introduced in 1987 as the typical vehicle for the securitization of residential mortgages in the United States.

== See also ==
- Financial asset securitization investment trust (FASIT)
- Collateralized mortgage obligation
