= Financial asset securitization investment trust =

Former type of debt security in the United States

A financial asset securitization investment trust (FASIT) was a type of special purpose entity used for securitization of any debt and issuance of asset-backed securities, defined under section 1621 of the Small Business Job Protection Act of 1996, and repealed under section 835 of the American Jobs Creation Act of 2004. They were similar to a Real Estate Mortgage Investment Conduit (REMIC) but could also securitize non-mortgage debts, such as automobile loans and credit card debt.

In the Enron scandal, Enron used FASITs to avoid Subpart F rules on foreign income. The United States Congress Joint Committee on Taxation staff, in their investigation of the Enron scandal, recommended that FASIT rules be repealed as they were "not widely used in the manner envisioned by the Congress and thus have failed to further their intended purposes" and because of the "abuse potential inherent in the FASIT vehicle".

== See also ==
- Real Estate Mortgage Investment Conduit (REMIC)
