= Weighted-average loan age =

The weighted-average loan age (WALA) is measure used in pools of mortgage-backed securities that defines the average number of months since the date of note origination of all the loans in a pool weighted by remaining principal balance. In the calculation each loan's size is in proportion to its aggregate total of the pool.

The measure are often used by organisations buying or selling securitized mortgages, like Fannie Mae in the United States. It helps investors estimate the amount of time before the whole pool is repaid. This number will fluctuate as mortgages in the pool are paid off. The main counterpart to the weighted-average loan age is the Weighted Average Maturity rate.
