= Mortgage-backed security =

Type of asset-backed security

A mortgage-backed security (MBS) is a type of asset-backed security (an "instrument") which is secured by a mortgage or collection of mortgages. The mortgages are aggregated and sold to a group of individuals (a government agency or investment bank) that securitizes, or packages, the loans together into a security that investors can buy. Bonds securitizing mortgages are usually treated as a separate class, termed residential; another class is commercial, depending on whether the underlying asset is mortgages owned by borrowers or assets for commercial purposes ranging from office space to multi-dwelling buildings.

The structure of the MBS may be known as "pass-through", where the interest and principal payments from the borrower or homebuyer pass through it to the MBS holder, or it may be more complex, made up of a pool of other MBSs. Other types of MBS include collateralized mortgage obligations (CMOs, often structured as real estate mortgage investment conduits) and collateralized debt obligations (CDOs).

As of 2025, the U.S. MBS market had more than $11 trillion in outstanding securities and almost $300 billion in average daily trading volume.

A mortgage bond is a bond backed by a pool of mortgages on a real estate asset such as a house. More generally, bonds which are secured by the pledge of specific assets are called mortgage bonds. Mortgage bonds can pay interest in either monthly, quarterly or semiannual periods. The prevalence of mortgage bonds is commonly credited to Mike Vranos.

The shares of subprime MBSs issued by various structures, such as CMOs, are not identical but rather issued as tranches (French for "slices"), each with a different level of priority in the debt repayment stream, giving them different levels of risk and reward. Tranches of an MBS—especially the lower-priority, higher-interest tranches—are/were often further repackaged and resold as collateralized debt obligations. These subprime MBSs issued by investment banks were a major issue in the subprime mortgage crisis of 2006–2008.

The total face value of an MBS decreases over time, because like mortgages, and unlike bonds, and most other fixed-income securities, the principal in an MBS is not paid back as a single payment to the bond holder at maturity but rather is paid along with the interest in each periodic payment (monthly, quarterly, etc.). This decrease in face value is measured by the MBS's "factor", the percentage of the original "face" that remains to be repaid.

In the United States, MBSs may be issued by structures set up by government-sponsored enterprises like Fannie Mae or Freddie Mac, or they can be "private-label", issued by structures set up by investment banks.

== Securitization ==
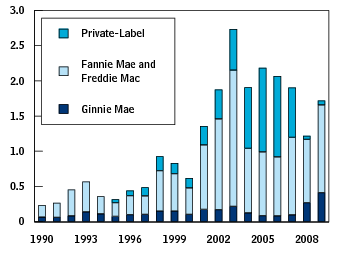
Value of mortgage-backed security issuances in $US trillions, 1990–2009. (source: sifma statistics, structured finance)

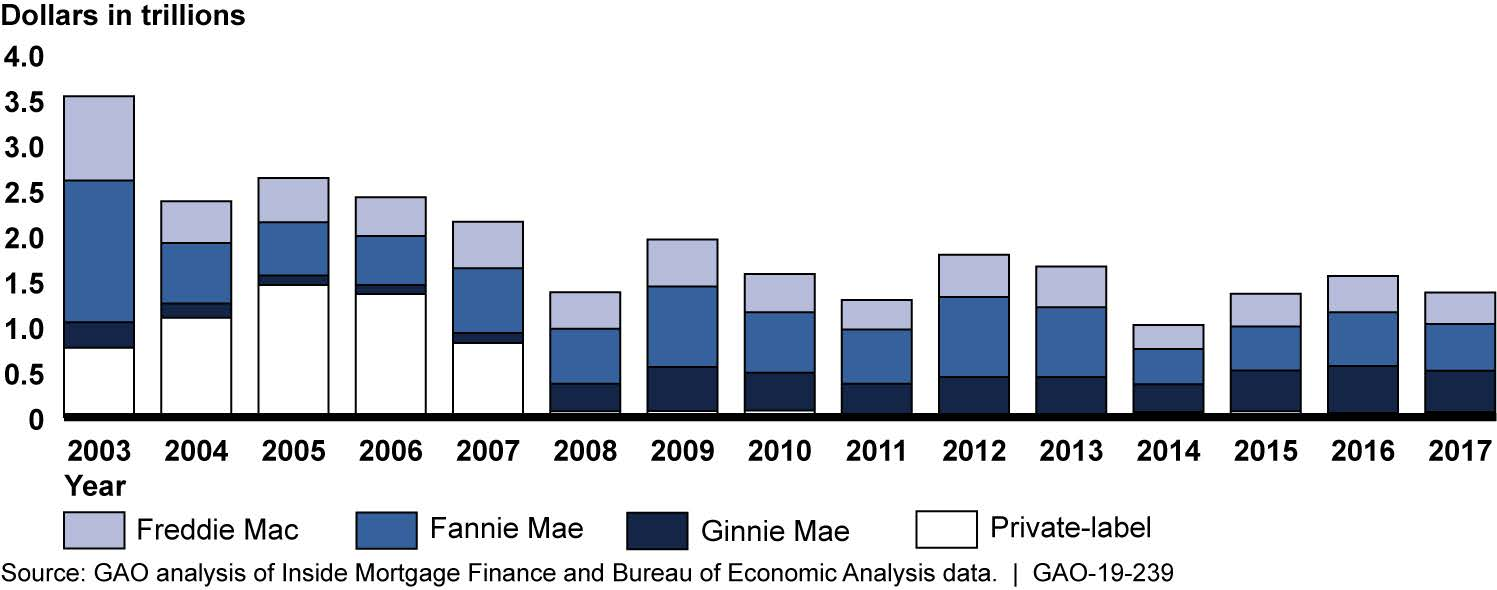
Single-family home mortgage-backed security issuance, 2003–2017

The process of securitization is complex and depends greatly on the jurisdiction within which the process is conducted. Among other things, securitization distributes risk and permits investors to choose different levels of investment and risk. The basics are:

1. Mortgage loans (mortgage notes) are purchased from banks and other lenders, and possibly assigned to a special purpose vehicle (SPV).
2. The purchaser or assignee assembles these loans into collections, or "pools".
3. The purchaser or assignee securitizes the pools by issuing mortgage-backed securities.

While a residential mortgage-backed security (RMBS) is secured by single-family, one- to four-unit real estate, a commercial mortgage-backed security (CMBS) is secured by commercial and multi-family properties, such as apartment buildings, retail or office properties, hotels, schools, industrial properties, and other commercial sites. A CMBS is usually structured as a different type of security than an RMBS.

These securitization trusts may be structured by government-sponsored enterprises as well as by private entities that may offer credit enhancement features to mitigate the risk of prepayment and default associated with these mortgages. Since residential mortgage holders in the United States have the option to pay more than the required monthly payment (curtailment) or to pay off the loan in its entirety usually without financial penalty (prepayment), the monthly cash flow of an MBS is not known in advance, and an MBS therefore presents a risk to investors.

In the United States, the most common securitization trusts are sponsored by Fannie Mae and Freddie Mac, US government-sponsored enterprises. Ginnie Mae, a US government-sponsored enterprise backed by the full faith and credit of the US government, guarantees that its investors receive timely payments but buys limited numbers of mortgage notes. Some private institutions also securitize mortgages, known as "private-label" mortgage securities. Issuances of private-label mortgage-backed securities increased dramatically from 2001 to 2007 and then ended abruptly in 2008, when real estate markets began to falter. An example of a private-label issuer is the real estate mortgage investment conduit (REMIC), a tax-structure entity usually used for CMOs; among other things, a REMIC structure avoids so-called double taxation.

=== Advantages and disadvantages ===
The securitization of mortgages in the 1970s had the advantage of providing more capital for housing at a time when the demographic bulge of baby boomers created a housing shortage and inflation was undermining a traditional source of housing funding, the savings and loan associations (or thrifts), which were limited to providing uncompetitive 5.75% interest rates on savings accounts and consequently losing savers' money to money market funds. Unlike the traditional localized, inefficient mortgage market where there might be a shortage or surplus of funds at any one time, MBSs were national and international in scope and regionally diversified. Mortgage-backed securities helped move interest rates out of the banking sector and facilitated greater specialization among financial institutions.

However, mortgage-backed securities may have "led inexorably to the rise of the subprime industry" and "created hidden, systemic risks". They also "undid the connection between borrowers and lenders". Historically, "less than 2% of people lost their homes to foreclosure", but with securitization, "once a lender sold a mortgage, it no longer had a stake in whether the borrower could make his or her payments."

== History ==
Among the early examples of mortgage-backed securities in the United States were the slave mortgage bonds of the early 18th century and the farm railroad mortgage bonds of the mid-19th century which may have contributed to the panic of 1857. There was also an extensive commercial MBS market in the 1920s.

=== US government ===
In June 1933, the Glass–Steagall Act was signed into law by President Franklin D. Roosevelt. This legislative initiative separated commercial banking from investment banking, providing safeguards against possible corruption with many types of investment securities (like the MBS). Even though the fixed-rate mortgage did not yet exist at this time, the law deemed it illegal for a banking institution to both sponsor debts and design investment vehicles or market-making tools as the selfsame entity. In other words, the Mortgage-Backed Security could probably not have existed at this time (without a little tweaking of the laws).

As part of the New Deal following the Great Depression, the US federal government created the Federal Housing Administration (FHA) with the National Housing Act of 1934 to assist in the construction, acquisition, and rehabilitation of residential properties. The FHA helped develop and standardize the fixed-rate mortgage as an alternative to the balloon payment mortgage by insuring them, and helped the mortgage design garner usage.

In 1938, the government also created the government-sponsored corporation Fannie Mae to create a liquid secondary market in these mortgages and thereby free up the loan originators to originate more loans, primarily by buying FHA-insured mortgages. As part of the Housing and Urban Development Act of 1968, Fannie Mae was split into the current Fannie Mae and Ginnie Mae to support the FHA-insured mortgages, as well as Veterans Administration (VA) and Farmers Home Administration (FmHA) insured mortgages, with the full faith and credit of the US government. In 1970, the federal government authorized Fannie Mae to purchase conventional mortgages—that is, those not insured by the FHA, VA, or FmHA, and created Freddie Mac to perform a role similar to that of Fannie Mae. Ginnie Mae does not invest in conventional mortgages.

=== Securitization ===
Ginnie Mae guaranteed the first mortgage pass-through security of an approved lender in 1968. In 1971, Freddie Mac issued its first mortgage pass-through, called a participation certificate, composed primarily of conventional mortgages. In 1981, Fannie Mae issued its first mortgage pass-through, called a mortgage-backed security. In 1983, Freddie Mac issued the first collateralized mortgage obligation.

In 1960 the government enacted the Real Estate Investment Trust Act to allow the creation of the real estate investment trust (REIT) to encourage real estate investment, and in 1977 Bank of America issued the first private label pass-through. In 1983 the Federal Reserve Board amended Regulation T to allow broker-dealers to use pass-throughs as margin collateral, equivalent to over-the-counter non-convertible bonds. In 1984 the government passed the Secondary Mortgage Market Enhancement Act to improve the marketability of private label pass-throughs, which declared nationally recognized statistical rating organization AA-rated mortgage-backed securities to be legal investments equivalent to Treasury securities and other federal government bonds for federally chartered banks (such as federal savings banks and federal savings associations), state-chartered financial institutions (such as depository banks and insurance companies) unless overridden by state law before October 1991 (which 21 states did), and Department of Labor–regulated pension funds.

The Tax Reform Act of 1986 allowed the creation of the tax-exempt real estate mortgage investment conduit (REMIC) special purpose vehicle for the express purpose of issuing pass-throughs. The Tax Reform Act may have contributed to the savings and loan crisis of the 1980s and 1990s that resulted in the Financial Institutions Reform, Recovery and Enforcement Act of 1989, which dramatically changed the savings and loan industry and its federal regulation, encouraging loan origination.

Nevertheless, probably the most influential action that encouraged the subprime mortgage crisis of 2008 (other than the neglectful actions of banking institutions) was the Financial Services Moderation Act (also called the Gramm–Leach–Bliley Act). It was signed into law in 1999 by President Clinton, and allowed sole, in-house creation (by solitary banking institutions) of Mortgage-Backed Securities as investment and derivatives instruments. This legislative decision did not just tweak or finesse the preexisting law, it effectively repealed the Glass-Steagall Act of 1933, the only remaining statutory safeguard poised against the ensuing disaster.

=== Subprime mortgage crisis ===
Low-quality mortgage-backed securities backed by subprime mortgages in the United States caused a crisis that played a major role in the 2008 financial crisis. By 2012 the market for high-quality mortgage-backed securities had recovered and was a profit center for US banks.

== Types ==
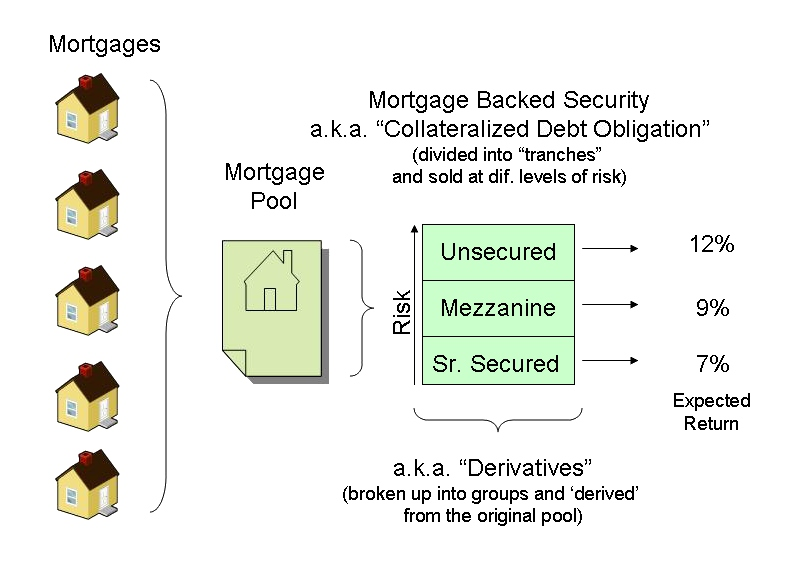

Most bonds backed by mortgages are classified as an MBS. This can be confusing because a security derived from an MBS is also called an MBS. To distinguish the basic MBS bond from other mortgage-backed instruments, the qualifier pass-through is used, in the same way that "vanilla" designates an option with no special features.

Subtypes of mortgage-backed security include:

Pass-through securities are issued by a trust and allocate the cash flows from the underlying pool to the securities holders on a pro rata basis. A trust that issues pass-through certificates is taxed under the grantor trust rules of the Internal Revenue Code. Under these rules, the holder of a pass-through certificate is taxed as a direct owner of the portion of the trust allocatable to the certificate. In order for the issuer to be recognized as a trust for tax purposes, there can be no significant power under the trust agreement to change the composition of the asset pool or otherwise to reinvest payments received, and the trust must have, with limited exceptions, only a single class of ownership interests.

  - A residential mortgage-backed security (RMBS) is a pass-through MBS backed by mortgages on residential property.
  - A commercial mortgage-backed security (CMBS) is a pass-through MBS backed by mortgages on commercial property. In addition to single-family residential mortgages, Fannie Mae and Freddie Mac also issue multi-family securities, expanding the diversity and reach of their securitization activities.

A collateralized mortgage obligation, or "pay-through bond", is a debt obligation of a legal entity that is collateralized by the assets it owns. Pay-through bonds are typically divided into classes that have different maturities and different priorities for the receipt of principal and in some cases of interest. They often contain a sequential pay security structure, with at least two classes of mortgage-backed securities issued, with one class receiving scheduled principal payments and prepayments before any other class. Pay-through securities are classified as debt for income tax purposes. A stripped mortgage-backed security (SMBS) where each mortgage payment is partly used to pay down the loan's principal and partly used to pay the interest on it. These two components can be separated to create SMBS's, of which there are two subtypes:

  - An interest-only stripped mortgage-backed security (IO) is a bond with cash flows backed by the interest component of property owner's mortgage payments.
    - A net interest margin security (NIMS) is re-securitized residual interest of a mortgage-backed security
  - A principal-only stripped mortgage-backed security (PO) is a bond with cash flows backed by the principal repayment component of property owner's mortgage payments.

There are a variety of underlying mortgage classifications in the pool:

Prime mortgages are conforming mortgages with prime borrowers, full documentation (such as verification of income and assets), strong credit scores, etc. Alt-A mortgages are an ill-defined category, generally prime borrowers but non-conforming in some way, often lower documentation (or in some other way: vacation home, etc.) Alt-A mortgages tend to be larger in

== Uses ==
Risk, Return, Rating and Yield relate

There are many reasons for mortgage originators to finance their activities by issuing mortgage-backed securities. Mortgage-backed securities:

1. transform relatively illiquid, individual financial assets into liquid and tradable capital market instruments
2. allow mortgage originators to replenish their funds, which can then be used for additional origination activities
3. can be used by Wall Street banks to monetize the credit spread between the origination of an underlying mortgage (private market transaction) and the yield demanded by bond investors through bond issuance (typically a public market transaction)
4. are often a more efficient and lower-cost source of financing in comparison with other bank and capital markets financing alternatives.
5. allow issuers to diversify their financing sources by offering alternatives to more traditional forms of debt and equity financing
6. allow issuers to remove assets from their balance sheet, which can help to improve various financial ratios, utilize capital more efficiently, and achieve compliance with risk-based capital standards

The high liquidity of most mortgage-backed securities means that an investor wishing to take a position need not deal with the difficulties of theoretical pricing described below; the price of any bond is essentially quoted at fair value, with a very narrow bid/offer spread.

Reasons (other than investment or speculation) for entering the market include the desire to hedge against a drop in prepayment rates (a critical business risk for any company specializing in refinancing).

== Market size and liquidity ==
As of the second quarter of 2011, there was about $13.7 trillion in total outstanding US mortgage debt. There were about $8.5 trillion in total US mortgage-related securities, with about $7 trillion of that securitized or guaranteed by government-sponsored enterprises or government agencies, and the remaining $1.5 trillion being pooled by private mortgage conduits.

As of 2021, the volume of mortgage-backed securities (MBS) outstanding in the United States has surpassed 12 trillion U.S. dollars, marking a significant growth in the market size. This expansion reflects the increasing role of MBS in the financing of residential real estate, demonstrating the importance of these securities in the overall financial system and housing market.

According to the Bond Market Association, gross US issuance of agency MBS was:

2005: USD 0.967 trillion 2004: USD 1.019 trillion 2003: USD 2.131 trillion 2002: USD 1.444 trillion 2001: USD 1.093 trillion This data underscores the fluctuating nature of the MBS market over time, influenced by varying economic conditions, interest rates, and housing market dynamics.

== Pricing ==
=== Valuation ===
The weighted-average maturity (WAM) and weighted average coupon (WAC) are used for valuation of a pass-through MBS, and they form the basis for computing cash flows from that mortgage pass-through. Just as this article describes a bond as a 30-year bond with 6% coupon rate, this article describes a pass-through MBS as a $3 billion pass-through with 6% pass-through rate, a 6.5% WAC, and 340-month WAM. The pass-through rate is different from the WAC; it is the rate that the investor would receive if he/she held this pass-through MBS, and the pass-through rate is almost always less than the WAC. The difference goes to servicing costs (i.e., costs incurred in collecting the loan payments and transferring the payments to the investors).

To illustrate these concepts, consider a mortgage pool with just three mortgage loans that have the following outstanding mortgage balances, mortgage rates, and months remaining to maturity:

Loan	Outstanding mortgage balance	Mortgage rate	Remaining months to maturity	Percentage of pool's total $900,000 balance (the loan's "weighting")
Loan 1	$200,000	6.00%	300	22.22̅%
Loan 2	$400,000	6.25%	260	44.44̅%
Loan 3	$300,000	6.50%	280	33.33̅%
Overall Pool	$900,000	WAC: 6.277̅%	WAM: 275.55̅	100%

==== Weighted-average maturity ====
The weighted-average maturity (WAM) of a pass-through MBS is the average of the maturities of the mortgages in the pool, weighted by their balances at the issue of the MBS. Note that this is an average across mortgages, as distinct from concepts such as weighted-average life and duration, which are averages across payments of a single loan.

The weightings are computed by dividing each outstanding loan amount by total amount outstanding in the mortgage pool (i.e., $900,000). These amounts are the outstanding amounts at the issuance or initiation of the MBS. The WAM for the above example is computed as follows:

WAM = (22.22̅% × 300) + (44.44̅% × 260) + (33.33̅% × 280) = 66.66̅ + 115.55̅ + 93.33̅ = 275.55̅ months

Another measure often used is the Weighted-average loan age.

==== Weighted-average coupon ====
The weighted-average coupon (WAC) of a pass-through MBS is the average of the coupons of the mortgages in the pool, weighted by their original balances at the issuance of the MBS. For the above example this is:

WAC = (22.22̅% × 6.00%) + (44.44̅% × 6.25%) + (33.33̅% × 6.50%) = 1.33̅% + 2.77̅% + 2.166̅% = 6.277̅%

=== Theoretical pricing ===
Pricing a "vanilla" corporate bond is based on two sources of uncertainty: default risk (credit risk) and interest rate (IR) exposure. The MBS adds a third risk: early redemption (prepayment). The number of homeowners in residential MBS securitizations who prepay increases when interest rates decrease. One reason for this phenomenon is that homeowners can refinance at a lower fixed interest rate. Commercial MBS often mitigate this risk using call protection.

Since these two sources of risk (IR and prepayment) are linked, solving mathematical models of MBS value is a difficult problem in finance. The level of difficulty rises with the complexity of the IR model and the sophistication of the prepayment IR dependence, to the point that no closed-form solution (i.e., one that could be written down) is widely known. In models of this type, numerical methods provide approximate theoretical prices. These are also required in most models that specify the credit risk as a stochastic function with an IR correlation. Practitioners typically use specialised Monte Carlo methods or modified Binomial Tree numerical solutions.

==== Interest rate risk and prepayment risk ====
Theoretical pricing models must take into account the link between interest rates and loan prepayment speed. Mortgage prepayments are usually made because a home is sold or because the homeowner is refinancing to a new mortgage, presumably with a lower rate or shorter term. Prepayment is classified as a risk for the MBS investor despite the fact that they receive the money, because it tends to occur when floating rates drop and the fixed income of the bond would be more valuable (negative convexity). In other words, the proceeds received would need to be reinvested at a lower interest rate. Hence the term prepayment risk.

Professional investors generally use arbitrage-pricing models to value MBS. These models deploy interest rate scenarios consistent with the current yield curve as drivers of the econometric prepayment models that models homeowner behavior as a function of projected mortgage rates. Given the market price, the model produces an option-adjusted spread, a valuation metric that takes into account the risks inherent in these complex securities.

There are other drivers of the prepayment function (or prepayment risk), independent of the interest rate, such as:

- economic growth, which is correlated with increased turnover in the housing market
- home prices inflation
- unemployment
- regulatory risk (if borrowing requirements or tax laws in a country change this can change the market profoundly)
- demographic trends, and a shifting risk aversion profile, which can make fixed rate mortgages relatively more or less attractive

==== Credit risk ====
The credit risk of mortgage-backed securities depends on the likelihood of the borrower paying the promised cash flows (principal and interest) on time. The credit rating of MBS is fairly high because:

1. Most mortgage originations include research on the mortgage borrower's ability to repay, and will try to lend only to the creditworthy. An important exception to this is "no-doc" or "low-doc" loans.
2. Some MBS issuers, such as Fannie Mae, Freddie Mac, and Ginnie Mae, guarantee against homeowner default risk. In the case of Ginnie Mae, this guarantee is backed with the full faith and credit of the US federal government. This is not the case with Fannie Mae and Freddie Mac, but these two entities have lines of credit with the US federal government; however, these lines of credit are extremely small compared to the average amount of money circulated through these entities in one day's business. Additionally, Fannie Mae and Freddie Mac generally require private mortgage insurance on loans in which the borrower provides a down payment that is less than 20% of the property value.
3. Pooling many mortgages with uncorrelated default probabilities creates a bond with a much lower probability of total default, in which no homeowners are able to make their payments (see Copula). Although the risk neutral credit spread is theoretically identical between a mortgage ensemble and the average mortgage within it, the chance of catastrophic loss is reduced.
4. If the property owner should default, the property remains as collateral. Although real estate prices can move below the value of the original loan, this increases the solidity of the payment guarantees and deters borrower default.

If the MBS was not underwritten by the original real estate and the issuer's guarantee, the rating of the bonds would be much lower. Part of the reason is the expected adverse selection against borrowers with improving credit (from MBSs pooled by initial credit quality) who would have an incentive to refinance (ultimately joining an MBS pool with a higher credit rating).

=== Real-world pricing ===
Because of the diversity in MBS types, there is a wide variety of pricing sources. In general, the more uniform or liquid the MBS, the greater the transparency or availability of prices. Most traders and money managers use Bloomberg and Intex to analyze MBS pools and more esoteric products such as CDOs, although tools such as Citi's The Yield Book, Barclays POINT, and BlackRock's AnSer are also prevalent across Wall Street, especially for multi–asset class managers. Some institutions have also developed their own proprietary software.

Complex structured products tend to trade less frequently and involve more negotiation. Prices for these more complicated MBSs, as well as for CMOs and CDOs, tend to be more subjective, often available only from dealers.

The price of an MBS pool is influenced by prepayment speed, usually measured in units of CPR or PSA. When a mortgage refinances or the borrower prepays during the month, the prepayment measurement increases.

If an investor has acquired a pool at a premium (>100), as is common for higher coupons, then they are at risk for prepayment. If the purchase price was 105, the investor loses 5 cents for every dollar prepaid, which may significantly decrease the yield. This is likely to happen as holders of higher-coupon mortgages can have a larger incentive to refinance.

Conversely, it may be advantageous to the bondholder for the borrower to prepay if the low-coupon MBS pool was bought at a discount (<100). This is due to the fact that when the borrower pays back the mortgage, he or she does so at "par". If an investor purchases a bond at 95 cents on the dollar, as the borrower prepays the investor gets the full dollar back, increasing their yield. However, this is less likely to occur, as borrowers with low-coupon mortgages have lower, or no, incentives to refinance.

The price of an MBS pool is also influenced by the loan balance. Common specifications for MBS pools are loan amount ranges that each mortgage in the pool must pass. Typically, high-premium (high-coupon) MBSs backed by mortgages with an original loan balance no larger than $85,000 command the largest pay-ups. Even though the borrower is paying an above market yield, he or she is dissuaded from refinancing a small loan balance due to the high fixed cost involved.

Low Loan Balance: < $85,000
Mid Loan Balance: $85,000–$110,000
High Loan Balance: $110,000–$150,000
Super High Loan Balance: $150,000–$175,000
New Loan Balance Buckets:

$175,000–$200,000
$200,000–$225,000
$225,000–$250,000
$250,000–$275,000
TBA: > $275,000 The plurality of factors makes it difficult to calculate the value of an MBS security. Often market participants do not concur, resulting in large differences in quoted prices for the same instrument. Practitioners constantly try to improve prepayment models and hope to measure values for input variables implied by the market. Varying liquidity premiums for related instruments and changing liquidity over time make this a difficult task. One factor used to express the price of an MBS security is the pool factor.

== Recording and Mortgage Electronic Registration Systems ==
One critical component of the securitization system in the US market is the Mortgage Electronic Registration Systems (MERS) created in the 1990s, which created a private system wherein underlying mortgages were assigned and reassigned outside of the traditional county-level recording process. The legitimacy and overall accuracy of this alternative recording system have faced serious challenges with the onset of the mortgage crisis: as the US courts flood with foreclosure cases, the inadequacies of the MERS model are being exposed, and both local and federal governments have begun to take action through suits of their own and the refusal (in some jurisdictions) of the courts to recognize the legal authority of MERS assignments. The assignment of mortgage (deed of trust) and note (obligation to pay the debt) paperwork outside of the traditional US county courts (and without recordation fee payment) is subject to legal challenge. Legal inconsistencies in MERS originally appeared trivial, but they may reflect dysfunctionality in the entire US mortgage securitization industry.

== See also ==
- A notes
- Bank of America Home Loans
- Constant Maturity Mortgage
- Covered_bond
- Dollar roll
- Lewis Ranieri, the father of MBSs
- New Century
- United States housing bubble

== Bibliography ==
- Fabozzi, Frank J.; Modigliani, Franco (1992). Mortgage and Mortgage-Backed Securities Markets. Boston, Mass.: Harvard Business School Press. ISBN 978-0-87584-322-3.
- Hayre, Lakhbir (2001). Salomon Smith Barney Guide to Mortgage-Backed and Asset-Backed Securities. Wiley. ISBN 978-0-471-38587-5.
- Lemke, Thomas P.; Lins, Gerald T.; Picard, Marie E. (2017). Mortgage-Backed Securities. Thomson West.
