= Interethnic Placement Act =

1996 US adoption law

The Interethnic Placement Act, also known as IEPA or the Interethnic Placement Provisions (Pub. L. 104-188, Enacted August 20, 1996), was enacted as title I, subtitle H, section 1808, Removal of Barriers to Interethnic Adoption, as part of the Small Business Job Protection Act of 1996 in the United States. Advocates of the amendments argued that it strengthened and clarified the Multi-Ethnic Placement Act of 1994 (also known as MEPA).

IEPA eliminated language in MEPA about cultural and racial considerations in the foster care and adoption processes. IEPA's proponents indicated that its primary purpose was to eliminate racial discrimination during federally funded foster care and adoption placements so that children will not be delayed nor denied placement based on their race, color, or national origin. This protection against discrimination also extends to foster and adoptive parents. IEPA established financial penalties for states that do not comply with these provisions. IEPA also reiterated MEPA's requirement that agencies need to recruit more racially diverse foster and adoptive parents in order to reflect the diverse children in need of placements.

IEPA's provisions do not apply to children protected under the Indian Child Welfare Act.
