= Residential mortgage-backed security =

Security backed by residential mortgages

Residential mortgage-backed security (RMBS) are a type of mortgage-backed security backed by residential real estate mortgages.

Bonds securitizing mortgages are usually treated as a separate class, making reference to the general package of financial agreements that typically represents cash yields that are paid to investors and that are supported by cash payments received from homeowners who pay interest and principal according to terms agreed to with their lenders; it is a funding instrument created by the "originator" or "sponsor" of the mortgage loan; without cross-collateralizing individual loans and mortgages (because it would be impossible to receive permission from individual homeowners), it is a funding instrument that pools the cash flow received from individuals and pays these cash receipts out with waterfall priorities that enable investors to become comfortable with the certainty of receipt of cash at any point in time.

There are multiple important differences between mortgage loans originated and serviced by banks and kept on the books of the bank and a mortgage loan that has been securitized as part of an RMBS. Chief among these is the result that the principal who interacts with the borrower, and drives the decision making of the "Servicer" who is newly introduced into the relationship, no longer has an obligation towards the responsibilities associated with the public trust and banking charter that traditionally controlled the loan relationships between banks and their customers. Unless a loan is reconstituted onto the balance sheet of an original lender, the retail-to-consumer relationship between the borrower and his bank is changed to a relationship that is between the original customer and a sophisticated accredited investor for whom the bank Servicer acts as a front.

An RMBS is often confusingly yet correctly referred to as a "bond-like" financial investment as a RMBS can be portrayed to have similar characteristics, including a "principal investment" and a "yield"; the "principal investment," however, does not represent the purchase of an individual promissory note issued by a homeowner, but rather represents the payment of "principal" for the right to receive cash flow from an investment agreement that involves many other understandings. Likewise, the "yield" is only the calculation of an imputed interest yield that stems from the receipt of the cashflows. The RMBS market represents the largest source of funding of residential mortgage loans to US homeowners (see below).

The performance of these securities has generally been considered more predictable than commercial mortgage-backed securities (CMBS), because of the large number of individual and geographically diversified loans that exist within any individual RMBS pool. There are many different types of RMBS, including mortgage pass-throughs, collateralized mortgage obligations (CMOs), and collateralized debt obligations (CDOs).

== Origins ==
The origins of modern residential mortgage-backed securities can be traced back to the Government National Mortgage Association (Ginnie Mae), although variations on mortgage securitization existed in the U.S. in the late 1800s and early 1900s. In 1968, Ginnie Mae was the first to issue a new type of government-backed bond, known as the residential mortgage-backed security. This bond took a number of home loans, pooled the monthly principal and interest payments and then used the monthly cash flows as backing for the bond(s). The principal of these mortgages was guaranteed by Ginnie Mae, but not the risk that borrowers pay off the principal balance early or opt to refinance the loan, a set of possible future outcomes known as "prepayment risk." Selling pools of mortgages in this way allowed Ginnie Mae to acquire new funds with which to buy additional home loans from mortgage brokers which furthered the agency's Congressionally mandated mission to "expand affordable housing". Because banks and other mortgage originators could sell their mortgages in an RMBS, they used the proceeds to make new mortgage loans.

Because these bonds had the full faith and backing of the United States government, they received high credit ratings and "paid an interest rate that was only slightly higher than Treasury bonds." Following the success of Ginnie Mae's offerings, the other two government-sponsored housing agencies, Fannie Mae and Freddie Mac, began offering their own versions of RMBS. The government's guarantee of the mortgage loans assured investors that if the borrower defaulted, they would be repaid in full. But in return for that guarantee, borrowers were held to strict underwriting standards. For example, with Fannie Mae, homebuyers had to make a minimum down payment of 10 percent of the home value, and the buyer's income had to be well documented and preferably from a periodic salary.

== Development of private-label MBSs ==
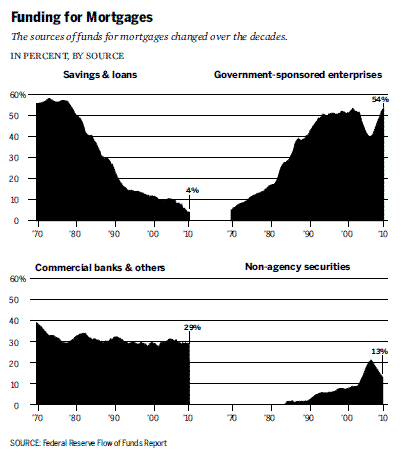
Funding for mortgages from S&Ls plummeted by almost the same amount as funding from Fannie and Freddie ("Government-sponsored enterprises") rose. Private-label RMBS ("Non-agency securities") funding peaked at about 21% before the subprime collapse. (source: Final Report of the National Commission on the Causes of the Financial and Economic Crisis in the United States, p.69 figure 5.1)

In the late 1970s, a team from Salomon Brothers worked with Bank of America to create the first residential-mortgage backed security that wasn't government-guaranteed. A Salomon Brothers' bond-trader by the name of Lewis Ranieri was instrumental in this effort. He coined the term "securitizing" during this period after joining the project in 1977. According to author Alyssa Katz, Ranieri's ambition was to revolutionize the mortgage market, which at this time was heavily dependent on the government sponsored housing insurance institutions (Ginnie Mae, Fannie Mae and Freddie Mac). His plan was to discover a way to make the mortgage market a fully private affair and to bring that goal to a reality, his team wished to create a security product "that could be bought and sold among investors".

The idea was to allow private banks to issue loans and then sell those loans to willing investors looking for a steady stream of income, freeing up capital with which the bank could then issue additional loans. Despite working on the project for three years, the bonds the Salomon team developed were a commercial failure due to various state regulations and federal securities laws dating back to the Great Depression

To fix this problem, Ranieri helped create and defend before Congress the Secondary Mortgage Market Enhancement Act of 1984 (SMMEA). Alyssa Katz, in her 2009 book on the recent history of the American real estate market, writes that SMMEA

called on bond-rating agencies — at the time, Moody’s and Standard & Poor’s — to weigh in on each mortgage pool. As long as a bond got one of the top ratings from the agencies — meaning that in the agencies’ opinions, investors ought to be confident of getting paid — it could be sold. While the Securities and Exchange Commission would oversee the trading of these securities just as it did all investments for sale, no longer would the U.S. government exclusively manage the market in mortgage-backed securities, as it had through Ginnie Mae. “We believe that the ratings services do offer substantial investor protection,” Ranieri testified before Congress in early 1984.

This law opened up the door to allow "federally-charted financial institutions, including credit unions," the ability to "invest in mortgage-related securities subject only to limitations that the appropriate regulating board might impose." It created the market for the private label MBS that did not exist when Ranieri was first developing them in 1977.

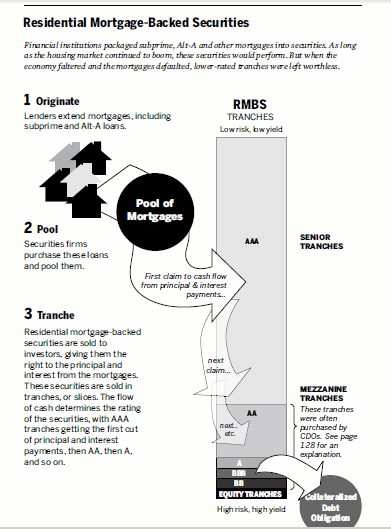
source: Final Report of the National Commission on the Causes of the Financial and Economic Crisis in the United States, p.73, figure 5.3

According to David Maxwell of Fannie Mae, the developers of "private-label" mortgage-backed securities did not seek to — or at least end up — undercutting and replacing the Fannie and Freddie's "agency" MBSs. They wanted "to find products they could profit from where they didn't have to compete with Fannie." Financial journalists Bethany McLean, and Joe Nocera, argue Ranieri and others on Wall Street realized they would never "dislodge [GSEs] Fannie and Freddie from their dominant position as the securitizers of traditional mortgages," but Fannie and Freddie had no business and no interest in non-prime mortgages (subprime or Alt-A mortgages). Thus the subprime market became the realm of private label Mortgage-Backed Securities.

=== Tranches ===
The MBSs of the "government-sponsored enterprise", Fannie and Freddie were considered to be "the equivalent of AAA-rated bonds" because of their high standards and suggestions of guarantee by the US government.

While private-label subprime mortgages would never be able to make that claim, by "slicing" the pooled mortgages into "tranches", each having a different priority in the stream of monthly or quarterly principal and interest stream, they could create triple A rated securities from the tranches with the highest priority — the most "senior" tranches.

Since the most senior tranche(s) was like a "bucket" being filled with the "water" of principal and interest that did not share this water with the next lowest bucket (i.e. tranche) until it was filled to the brim and overflowing, the top buckets/tranches (in theory) had considerable creditworthiness and could earn the highest credit ratings, making them salable to money market and pension funds that would not otherwise deal with subprime mortgage securities.

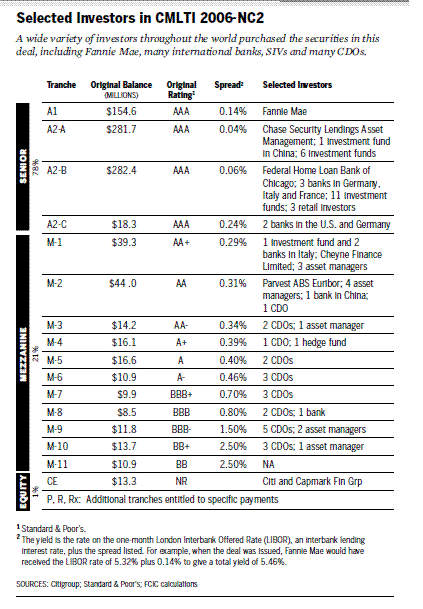
source: Final Report of the National Commission on the Causes of the Financial and Economic Crisis in the United States, p. 116 figure 7.2

The first private label deals in the late 1980s and early 1990 often had only two tranches, but by 2005–06 the deals became more complex. One "typical" mortgage-backed "deal" from one of the peak years of private label subprime mortgage securities (2006) was described in the Financial Crisis Inquiry Report. (See table to the right.) Dubbed "CMLTI 2006-NC2", the deal involved 4499 subprime mortgages originated by New Century Financial—a California-based lender—and issued by a special purpose entity created and sponsored by Citigroup. The entity issued 19 tranches of mortgage-backed bonds worth $947 million. Since Citigroup and other firms focused on achieving high ratings, the (four) senior ranches rated triple A made up 78% or $737 million of the deal. Eleven tranches were "mezzanine" – three rated AA, three A, three BBB and two BB (junk). The most junior tranche was known as "equity" or "residual" or "first loss". It had no credit rating and was split between Citigroup and a hedge fund. The more "junior" the tranche, the higher its risk and the higher its interest rate in compensation.

According to business columnist Joe Nocera, as of mid-2013, "the market for private mortgage-backed securities ... remains moribund"[27]; its financing has become dominated by Fannie and Freddie.

== Growth, innovation, corruption ==
Residential mortgage-backed securities and similar sounding products would continue to expand and become more complex throughout the 1980s. For example, in 1983 Freddie Mac marketed the first collateralized mortgage obligation (CMO)

Eventually structured finance would explode with the development of the collateralized debt obligation (CDO) in 1987 and even further inventions, like the CDO-Squared. CDOs were originally used to pool many different RMBSs (which were themselves pools of residential mortgages) and then divide them up into tranches and sell them off to investors. The result of these financial innovations was a secondary mortgage market existing outside of the government-sponsored entities that provided a massive growth opportunity for Wall Street banks. According to former International Monetary Fund chief economist Simon Johnson, the "total volume of private mortgage-backed securities (excluding those issued by Ginnie Mae, Fannie Mae and Freddie Mac) grew from $11 billion in 1984 to over $200 billion in 1994 to close to $3 trillion in 2007."

The private mortgage securitization market continued to grow. In 2004 the "commercial banks, thrifts, and investment banks caught up with Fannie Mae and Freddie Mac in securitizing home loans", and by 2005 they overtook them. Private MBS grew primarily by lowering their standards and securitizing more low-quality, high-risk mortgages such as Alt-A, and subprime mortgages. Scholar Michael Simkovic argues that this relaxation of standards was due to greater competition between securitizers for loans, and greater market power for loan originators. Financial journalists Bethany McLean and Joe Nocera argue that Wall Street securitizers encouraged relaxation of standards because poor-quality loans "meant higher yields".

GSEs also relaxed their standards in response, but GSE standards generally remained higher than private market standards, and GSE securitizations generally continued to perform well compared to the rest of the market. However, some believe the dominance of the GSEs distorted the market, leading to overpricing that helped lead to the real estate bubble and the ultimate federal government bailout of the GSEs. As a result, several legislative and other proposals for gradually winding down the GSEs have been developed.

== Market collapse ==
The very rapid growth in low-quality mortgages, financed through securitization, is widely believed to be one of the major causes of the Great Recession and the subprime mortgage crisis. The private RMBS market largely collapsed after 2008 and has been replaced by government-backed securitization characterized by much tighter underwriting and higher standards.

== See also ==
- Bonds
- Convexity risk
- Fixed income securities
- Mortgage loan (section The United States mortgage finance industry)
- Russian mortgage certificate
- Subprime mortgage crisis
