= Yield spread =

Difference in percentage rate of return of two investments

In finance, the yield spread or credit spread is the difference between the quoted rates of return on two different investments, usually of different credit qualities but similar maturities. It is often an indication of the risk premium for one investment product over another. The phrase is a compound of yield and spread.

The "yield spread of X over Y" is generally the annualized percentage yield to maturity (YTM) of financial instrument X minus the YTM of financial instrument Y. There are several measures of yield spread relative to a benchmark yield curve, including interpolated spread (I-spread), zero-volatility spread (Z-spread), and option-adjusted spread (OAS).

It is also possible to define a yield spread between two different maturities of otherwise comparable bonds. For example, if a certain bond with a 10-year maturity yields 8% and a comparable bond from the same issuer with a 5-year maturity yields 5%, then the term premium between them may be quoted as 8% – 5% = 3%. A "credit spread curve" (usually, positively sloped) depicts the relationship between credit spread and maturity, i.e. term structure; curves may also be constructed for credit structure.

== Yield spread analysis ==
Yield spread analysis involves comparing the yield, maturity, liquidity and creditworthiness of two instruments, or of one security relative to a benchmark, and tracking how particular patterns vary over time.

When yield spreads widen between bond categories with different credit ratings, all else equal, it implies that the market is factoring more risk of default on the lower-grade bonds. For example, if a risk-free 10-year Treasury note is currently yielding 5% while junk bonds with the same duration are averaging 7%, then the spread between Treasuries and junk bonds is 2%. If that spread widens to 4% (increasing the junk bond yield to 9%), then the market is forecasting a greater risk of default, probably because of weaker economic prospects for the borrowers. A narrowing of yield spreads (between bonds of different risk ratings) implies that the market is factoring in less risk, probably due to an improving economic outlook.

The TED spread is one commonly-quoted credit spread. The difference between Baa-rated ten-year corporate bonds and ten-year Treasuries is another commonly-quoted credit spread.

== Consumer loans ==
Yield spread can also be an indicator of profitability for a lender providing a loan to an individual borrower. For consumer loans, particularly home mortgages, an important yield spread is the difference between the interest rate actually paid by the borrower on a particular loan and the (lower) interest rate that the borrower's credit would allow that borrower to pay. For example, if a borrower's credit is good enough to qualify for a loan at 5% interest rate but accepts a loan at 6%, then the extra 1% yield spread (with the same credit risk) translates into additional profit for the lender. As a business strategy, lenders typically offer yield spread premiums to brokers who identify borrowers willing to pay higher yield spreads.

== See also ==
- I-spread
- Option-adjusted spread
- Spread trade
- Yield curve
- Yield spread premium
- Z-spread
