= Multi-Ethnic Placement Act =

1994 US law

The Multiethnic Placement Act, also known as MEPA (Pub. L. 103-382, Enacted October 20, 1994) was passed as a part of the Improving America's Schools Act as part of federal efforts to reduce delays in the permanent placement of children in out of home care. MEPA contains three major provisions affecting child welfare policy and practice:

- Prohibits agencies from refusing or delaying foster or adoptive placements because of a child's or foster/adoptive parent's race, color, or national origin
- Prohibits agencies from considering race, color, or national origin as a basis for denying approval as a foster or adoptive parent
- Requires agencies to diligently recruit a diverse base of foster and adoptive parents to better reflect the racial and ethnic makeup of children in out of home care

These mandates apply to all entities dealing with foster/adoptive placement and recruitment who receive federal funding, and are requirements for receiving such funding. MEPA was later amended in 1996 by the Interethnic Placement Provisions (or Interethnic Placement Act) included in the Small Business Job Protection Act of 1996.
