= PSA prepayment model =

The PSA prepayment model is a prepayment scale developed by the Public Securities Association in 1985 for analyzing American mortgage-backed securities. The PSA model assumes increasing prepayment rates for the first 30 months after mortgage origination and a constant prepayment rate thereafter. This approximates real-world experience that during the first few years, mortgage borrowers:

- Are less likely to relocate to a different home,
- Are less likely to refinance into a new mortgage, and
- Are less likely to make extra payments of principal.

The standard model (also called "100% PSA") works as follows: Starting with an annualized prepayment rate of 0.2% in month 1, the rate increases by 0.2% each month, until it reaches 6% in month 30. From the 30th month onward, the model assumes an annualized prepayment rate of 6% of the remaining balance. Each monthly prepayment is assumed to represent full payoff of individual loans, rather than a partial prepayment that leaves a loan with a reduced principal balance.

Variations of the model are expressed in percent, e.g., "150% PSA" means a monthly increase of 0.3% in the annualized prepayment rate, until the peak of 9% is reached after 30 months. The months thereafter have a constant annualized prepayment rate of 9%.

1667% PSA is roughly equivalent to a 100% prepayment rate in month 30 or later.

== See also ==
- Mortgage-backed security
- Prepayment of loan
- Refinancing
- Mortgage loan
- Public Securities Association
