= Mortgage servicer =

Company that handles mortgage payments and services

A mortgage servicer is a company to which some borrowers pay their mortgage loan payments and which performs other services in connection with mortgages and mortgage-backed securities. The mortgage servicer may be the entity that originated the mortgage, or it may have purchased the mortgage servicing rights from the original mortgage lender. The duties of a mortgage servicer vary, but typically include the acceptance and recording of mortgage payments; calculating variable interest rates on adjustable rate loans; payment of taxes and insurance from borrower escrow accounts; negotiations of workouts and modifications of mortgage upon default; and conducting or supervising the foreclosure process when necessary.

Many borrowers confuse their mortgage servicer with their lender. A mortgage servicer may be a borrower's lender, but often the beneficial rights to the payment of principal and interest on mortgages are sold to investors such as Fannie Mae, Freddie Mac, Ginnie Mae, FHA, and private investors in mortgage securitization transactions. Banking organizations often perform mortgage servicing not only for mortgages they originate but for others where they have purchased the servicing rights.

== Controversies ==
=== Reluctance to modify mortgages, prevent foreclosures ===
In July 2009, the mortgage servicing industry received criticism for many servicers' apparent unwillingness to modify adjustable rate mortgages held by homeowners on the verge of foreclosure in the United States. Despite pressure from President Barack Obama's Administration on mortgage servicers to permanently modify thousands of loans to make them more affordable and prevent foreclosures, allegations arose that the servicers had an apparent conflict of interest which led them to stop or slow the modification process in many cases. Industry insiders and legal experts cited the lucrative fees which mortgage servicers charge to delinquent homeowners as the main reason behind the slow and difficult process of modifying a mortgage.

=== Accusations of "robo-signing," foreclosure document fraud ===
In October 2010, many major mortgage servicers in the United States came under intense media and government scrutiny for their alleged mishandling of the large amount of foreclosures moving through the court system. Allegations included foreclosures being processed with missing or questionable paperwork (including paperwork showing proper chain of title on the part of the investment bank), falsifying dates and other information in foreclosure documents and "robo-signing," the practice of paying under-qualified personnel to sign hundreds or thousands of foreclosure documents a day, often without properly reviewing the documents.

=== Congressional hearings ===
The alleged problems regarding foreclosure fraud were so widespread and popularized by the media that U.S. Congresswoman Maxine Waters announced that the United States House of Representatives subcommittee on housing issues will hold a hearing on November 18, 2010 to examine problems emerging in the mortgage servicing industry.

=== Illegal foreclosures and mortgage overcharges on active-duty military members ===
The Servicemembers Civil Relief Act (SCRA) of 2003 protects United States active-duty military members from civil court proceedings (such as foreclosure) while serving their country. The SCRA also limits the interest rate which an active-duty military member can be charged on any outstanding debt (secured before their deployment) to 6% (six percentage points). In spite of these special protections granted to active-duty military members, news reports surfaced in which large mortgage servicers and investment banks illegally overcharged military families with members on active duty on their mortgages.

In January 2011, JP Morgan Chase, the United States' second-largest bank based on market share, admitted that it had illegally overcharged some 4,000 active-duty military members on their home mortgage and accidentally foreclosed on as many as 14 families. Facing pressure from a United States Marine's lawsuit over the violations, Chase announced that it would work to reverse the illegal foreclosures and was mailing $2 million to the 4,000 military families as compensation, implying the mortgage bank overcharged each family an average of $500 on their mortgage. Lawsuits regarding the overcharges are still pending as of January 2011.

Delaware Attorney General Beau Biden sent a letter to several large lending institutions demanding they review their operations in order to safeguard active-duty military members from illegal mortgage overcharges and fraudulent foreclosures. Those institutions included Citigroup, Inc., Bank of America Corp., Wells Fargo & Co., PNC Financial Services Group Inc., Ally Financial Inc. and Goldman Sachs Group Inc.'s Litton Loans.

=== International Mortgage Servicing Problems ===
The controversy over mortgage servicing mistakes is not confined to the United States. Over 18,000 British homeowners holding adjustable rate mortgages with Yorkshire Bank and Clydesdale Bank found in July 2010 that their monthly variable interest rates had been miscalculated by a software error. The resulting corrected amortization schedule for their mortgage resulted in increased payments on an average of several hundred pounds a year.

In Ireland, 436 mortgage holders with Allied Irish Bank learned in 2009 they were overcharged by an average of €900. In a statement, the bank claimed, "The error happened when customers were charged an interest rate that did not match the loan-to-value ratio on their account."

An Australian businessman who owned 3 blocks of property with several business partners won a judgement against National Australia Bank in 2010, in which the Supreme Court of New South Wales found that the bank had incorrectly charged excess interest on the related mortgages on two separate occasions. During one period of time, the interest rate on the mortgage was to be fixed at 5.65%, but NAB incorrectly charged 5.85%. At another point during the servicing of the mortgage, National Australia Bank incorrectly charged a "default" interest rate of 20%, when it should have charged less than 6%, as the loan was not in default. Even if the Australian bank had a legitimate reason to charge such a default rate, that rate should have only been an additional 4%, not 14% according to Justice Stephen Rothman's judgement. The entire proceedings lasted six years.
