= I-spread =

Bond and yield

The Interpolated Spread, I-spread or ISPRD of a bond is the difference between its yield to maturity and the linearly interpolated yield for the same maturity on an appropriate reference yield curve. The reference curve may refer to government debt securities or interest rate swaps or other benchmark instruments, and should always be explicitly specified. If the bond is expected to repay some principal before its final maturity, then the interpolation may be based on the weighted-average life, rather than the maturity.

== See also ==
- Asset swap spread
- Option-adjusted spread
- Z-spread
