= Prepayment of loan =

Early repayment of a loan by a borrower

Prepayment is the early repayment of a loan by a borrower, in part (commonly known as a curtailment) or in full, often as a result of optional refinancing to take advantage of lower interest rates.

In the case of a mortgage-backed security (MBS), prepayment is perceived as a financial risk—sometimes known as "call risk"—because mortgage loans are often paid off early in order to incur lower interest payments through cheaper refinancing. The new financing may be cheaper because the borrower's credit has improved or because market interest rates have fallen; but in either of these cases, the payments that would have been made to the MBS investor would be above current market rates. Redeeming such loans early through prepayment reduces the investor's upside from credit and interest rate variability in an MBS, and in essence forces the MBS investor to reinvest the proceeds at lower interest rates. If instead the borrower's opportunities deteriorate (creditworthiness declines or market interest rates rise), then the borrower loses the incentive to refinance, since the existing mortgage interest rate cannot be reduced with a new mortgage. The fact that MBS investors are exposed to downside prepayment risk, but rarely benefit from it, means that these bonds must pay an incrementally higher interest rate than similar bonds without prepayment risk, to be attractive investments. (This is the embedded "option cost" that results in a lower option-adjusted spread.) Similar issues arise for callable bonds in the American municipal, corporate, and government agency sectors.

As another way to compensate for prepayment risk (which is a reinvestment risk), a prepayment penalty clause is often included in the loan contract. "Soft" prepayment terms can allow prepayment without penalty if the home is sold. "Hard" prepayment terms do not allow any exceptions without penalty.

Bond issuers can mitigate some prepayment risk by issuing what are called "super sinker" bonds. Super sinkers are usually home-financing bonds that repay bondholders their principal quickly if homeowners prepay their mortgages. In other words, mortgage prepayments are used to retire a specified maturity. Super sinkers are likely to be paid off in a relatively short time. As a result, the bondholders may receive higher long-term yields after only a short period.

Individual borrowers who expect to prepay their loans early should generally favor a combination of lower principal balance and higher interest rate (which stops accruing after prepayment), rather than a below-market interest rate and higher principal balance (which much be paid in full, regardless of prepayment). In general, only borrowers who expect to keep their loans for many years should opt for below-market interest rates by paying mortgage origination points or forgoing automobile rebates.

Homeowner prepayment decisions are impacted by a number of variables and are notoriously hard to predict, adding another layer of uncertainty to investing in MBS markets. Prepayment speeds can be expressed in SMM (single monthly mortality), CPR (conditional prepayment rate, which is the annually compounded SMM), or PSA (percentage of the Public Securities Association prepayment model). For mortgages at least 30 months old, 100% PSA = 6.0% CPR = 0.51% SMM, equivalent to the full prepayment of 6% of a pool's remaining mortgages each year.
