= Loan agreement =

Financial and legal contract

A loan agreement (also known as a lending agreement) is a contract between a borrower and a lender which regulates the mutual promises made by each party. There are many types of loan agreements, including facilities agreements, revolvers, term loans, and working capital loans. Loan agreements are documented via a compilation of the various mutual promises made by the involved parties.

Prior to entering into a commercial loan agreement, the borrower first makes representations about their affairs, including their character, creditworthiness, cashflow, and any collateral available to pledge as security for the loan. These representations are taken into consideration, and the lender then determines under what conditions, if any, it is prepared to advance money.

Loan agreements, like any contract, involve an offer, acceptance of the offer, and consideration, and can only be formed for purposes that are legal. Loan agreements are documented through commitment letters, agreements reflecting the understandings reached between the parties, a promissory note, and a collateral agreement, such as a mortgage or a personal guarantee. Loan agreements offered by regulated banks differ from those offered by finance companies, since banks operate under a banking charter that carries regulatory obligations connected to public trust.

Loan agreements are usually in written form, but there is no legal reason why a loan agreement cannot be a purely oral contract, although oral agreements are more difficult to enforce.

== Types ==
For commercial banks and large finance companies, individual loan agreements are not usually categorized, although loan portfolios are often broadly characterized as "personal" and "commercial" loans, with the "commercial" category further subdivided into "industrial" and "commercial real estate" loans. Industrial loans are assessed on the cashflow and creditworthiness of the borrowing company and the goods or services it sells. Commercial real estate loans are typically repaid from the rental revenues paid by tenants who lease space, usually over extended terms. More granular categorizations of loan portfolios exist, but these are generally variations on these broader themes.

Loan agreements originated by commercial banks, savings banks, finance companies, insurance companies, and investment banks differ substantially from one another and serve different purposes. Commercial banks and savings banks, because they accept deposits and benefit from FDIC insurance, generate loans that incorporate considerations of public trust; historically, this was overseen by state bank regulators, who monitored how local deposits were used to fund the working-capital needs of local businesses. Insurance companies, which collect premiums for life or property/casualty coverage, developed their own types of loan agreements. Banks' and insurance companies' loan documentation standards evolved separately, shaped by policies addressing each type of institution's liabilities: for banks, the liquidity needs of depositors; for insurers, the liquidity needs associated with expected claims payments.

Investment banks create loan agreements that cater to the needs of the investors whose funds they seek to attract; such investors are typically sophisticated, accredited organizations not subject to bank regulatory supervision. Investment banking activities in the United States are supervised by the SEC, whose focus is primarily on whether adequate disclosures are made to the parties providing the funds.

=== By number of lenders ===
- Bilateral loans, made by a single lender.
- Syndicated loans, provided by a group of lenders and structured, arranged, and administered by one or several commercial banks or investment banks known as lead arrangers.

=== By repayment structure ===
Categorizing loan agreements by type of facility usually results in two primary categories:

- term loans, which are repaid in set installments over the term, or
- revolving loans (or overdrafts), where up to a maximum amount can be withdrawn at any time, and interest is paid from month to month on the drawn amount.

Within these two categories, there are various subdivisions, such as interest-only loans and balloon payment loans. Loans can also be subcategorized according to whether they are a secured loan or an unsecured loan, and whether the rate of interest is fixed or floating.

== Typical contents ==
Forms of loan agreements vary tremendously from industry to industry and country to country, but a professionally drafted commercial loan agreement will characteristically incorporate the following terms:

1. Parties to the contract, with their addresses
2. Definitions or interpretation provisions
3. Facility and purpose (Note: Purpose provisions serve a variety of purposes in different jurisdictions, but they are often used to seek to impose a Quistclose trust on the loan proceeds if the stated purpose of the loan becomes impossible.)
4. Conditions precedent to utilization
5. Repayment provisions
6. Prepayment and cancellation provisions
7. Interest and interest periods
8. Provisions dealing with gross-up in relation to any withholding imposed
9. Payments provisions
10. Representations of the borrower
11. Representations of the lender
12. Covenants of the borrower (Note: Such as a negative pledge.)
13. Events of default
14. Remedies in the event of default
15. Provisions for penalties and liquidated damages
16. For syndicated loans, provisions relating to the facility agent and security agent and voting of the lenders
17. Formulae for calculations
18. Provisions for fees of the lenders
19. Provisions for expenses
20. Securitization provisions
21. Amendments and waivers provisions
22. Covenants relating to changes in parties
23. Set-off clause
24. Severability clause
25. Counterparts clause
26. Addresses for notices
27. Language provisions
28. Choice of law clause
29. Forum selection clause
30. Appointment of a process agent

== See also ==
- Debt
- Cleanup clause
- Cov-lite
- Gross-up clause
