= Libor =

Interest rate benchmark

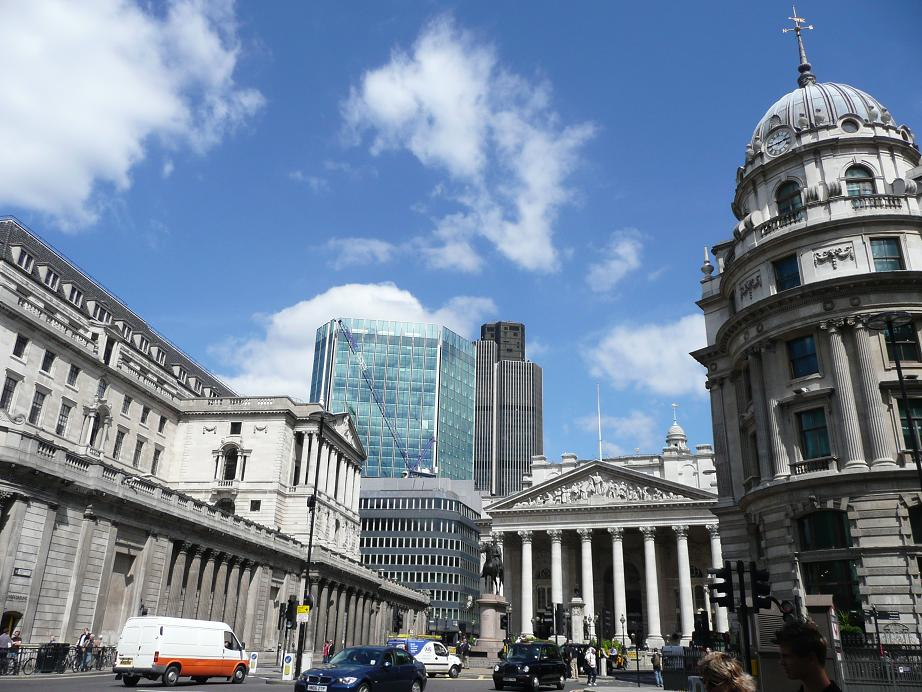
Libor gets its name from the City of London.

The London Inter-Bank Offered Rate (Libor /ˈlaɪbɔːr/ LY-bor) (Note: Usually abbreviated to Libor or LIBOR, or more officially to ICE LIBOR (for Intercontinental Exchange LIBOR). It was formerly known as BBA Libor (for British Bankers' Association Libor) before the responsibility for the administration was transferred to Intercontinental Exchange.) was an interest rate average calculated from estimates submitted by the leading banks in London. Each bank estimated what it would be charged were it to borrow from other banks. (Note: Note in particular that Libor was an estimated borrowing rate, not an estimated lending rate. The average rate was computed after excluding the highest and lowest quartile of these estimates. For much of its history, there were sixteen banks in each panel, so the highest and lowest four were removed.) It was the primary benchmark, along with the Euribor, for short-term interest rates around the world. Libor was phased out at the end of 2021, with market participants encouraged to transition to risk-free interest rates such as SOFR and SARON.

LIBOR was discontinued in the summer of 2023. The last rates were published on 30 June 2023 before noon UK time. The 1 month, 3 month, 6 month, and 12 month Secured Overnight Financing Rate (SOFR) is its replacement. In July 2023, the International Organization of Securities Commissions (IOSCO) said four unnamed dollar-denominated alternatives to LIBOR, known as "credit-sensitive rates", had "varying degrees of vulnerability" that might appear during times of market stress.

Libor rates were calculated for five currencies and seven borrowing periods, ranging from overnight to one year, and were published each business day by Thomson Reuters. Many financial institutions, mortgage lenders, and credit card agencies set their own rates relative to it. At least $350 trillion in derivatives and other financial products were tied to Libor.

In June 2012, multiple criminal settlements by Barclays Bank revealed significant fraud and collusion by member banks connected to the rate submissions, leading to the Libor scandal. The British Bankers' Association said on 25 September 2012 that it would transfer oversight of Libor to UK regulators, as proposed by Financial Services Authority managing director Martin Wheatley's independent review recommendations. Wheatley's review recommended that banks submitting rates to Libor must base them on actual inter-bank deposit market transactions and keep records of those transactions, that individual banks' Libor submissions be published after three months, and recommended criminal sanctions specifically for manipulation of benchmark interest rates. Financial institution customers may experience higher and more volatile borrowing and hedging costs after implementation of the recommended reforms. The UK government agreed to accept all of the Wheatley Review's recommendations and press for legislation implementing them.

Significant reforms, in line with the Wheatley Review, came into effect in 2013 and a new administrator took over in early 2014. The British government regulated Libor through criminal and regulatory laws passed by Parliament. In particular, the Financial Services Act 2012 brought Libor under UK regulatory oversight and created a criminal offence for knowingly or deliberately making false or misleading statements relating to benchmark-setting.

== Introduction ==
The London Interbank Offered Rate (LIBOR) came into widespread use in the 1970s as a reference interest rate for transactions in offshore Eurodollar markets. In 1984, it became apparent that an increasing number of banks were trading actively in a variety of relatively new market instruments, notably interest rate swaps, foreign currency options and forward rate agreements. While recognizing that such instruments brought more business and greater depth to the London Inter-bank market, bankers worried that future growth could be inhibited unless a measure of uniformity was introduced. In October 1984, the British Bankers' Association (BBA)—working with other parties, such as the Bank of England—established various working parties, which eventually culminated in the production of the BBA standard for interest rate swaps, or "BBAIRS" terms. Part of this standard included the fixing of BBA interest-settlement rates, the predecessor of BBA Libor. From 2 September 1985, the BBAIRS terms became standard market practice. BBA Libor fixings did not commence officially before 1 January 1986. Before that date, however, some rates were fixed for a trial period commencing in December 1984.

Member banks are international in scope, with more than sixty nations represented among its 223 members and 37 associated professional firms as of 2008. Seventeen banks for example contributed at one point to the fixing of US Dollar Libor. The panel contains the following member banks:

- Bank of America
- Bank of Tokyo-Mitsubishi UFJ
- Barclays Bank
- Citibank NA
- Credit Agricole CIB
- Credit Suisse
- Deutsche Bank
- HSBC
- JP Morgan Chase
- Lloyds Banking Group
- Rabobank
- Royal Bank of Canada
- Société Générale
- Sumitomo Mitsui Banking Corporation Europe Ltd
- Norinchukin Bank
- Royal Bank of Scotland
- UBS AG

== Scope ==
Libor was widely used as a reference rate for many financial instruments in both financial markets and commercial fields. There were three major classifications of interest rate fixings instruments, including standard inter-bank products, commercial field products, and hybrid products that often used Libor as their reference rate.

Standard interbank products:

- Forward rate agreements
- Interest rate futures, e.g. Eurodollar futures
- Interest rate swaps
- Swaptions
- Overnight indexed swaps, e.g. Libor–OIS spread
- Interest rate options, Interest rate cap and floor

Commercial field products:

- Floating rate notes
- Floating rate certificates of deposit
- Syndicated loans
- Variable rate mortgages
- Term loans

Hybrid products:

- Range accrual notes
- Step up callable notes
- Target redemption notes
- Hybrid perpetual notes
- Collateralized mortgage obligations
- Collateralized debt obligations

In the United States in 2008, around sixty percent of prime adjustable-rate mortgages and nearly all subprime mortgages were indexed to the US dollar Libor. In 2012, around 45 percent of prime adjustable rate mortgages and more than 80 percent of subprime mortgages were indexed to the Libor. American municipalities also borrowed around 75 percent of their money through financial products that were linked to the Libor. In the UK, the three-month British pound Libor was used for some mortgages—especially for those with adverse credit history. The Swiss franc Libor was also used by the Swiss National Bank as their reference rate for monetary policy.

The usual reference rate for euro-denominated interest rate products is the Euribor, compiled by the European Banking Federation from a larger bank panel. A euro Libor did exist, but mainly for continuity purposes in swap contracts dating back to pre-EMU times. The Libor was an estimate, not intended for the binding contracts of a company. It was, however, specifically mentioned as a reference rate in the market standard International Swaps and Derivatives Association documentation, which were used by parties wishing to transact in over-the-counter interest rate derivatives.

== Definition ==
Libor was defined as:

The rate at which an individual Contributor Panel bank could borrow funds, were it to do so by asking for and then accepting inter-bank offers in reasonable market size, just prior to 11.00 London time.

This definition was amplified as follows:

- The rate that each bank submits must be formed from that bank's perception of its cost of funds in the inter-bank market.
- Contributions must represent rates formed in London and not elsewhere.
- Contributions must be for the currency concerned, not the cost of producing one currency by borrowing in another currency and accessing the required currency via the foreign exchange markets.
- The rates must be submitted by members of staff at a bank with primary responsibility for management of a bank's cash, rather than a bank's derivative book.
- The definition of "funds" is: unsecured inter-bank cash or cash raised through primary issuance of inter-bank certificates of deposit.

The British Bankers' Association published a basic guide to the BBA Libor, which contains a great deal of detail as to its history and its current calculation.

== Technical features ==
=== Calculation ===
Libor was calculated by the Intercontinental Exchange (ICE) and published by Refinitiv. It was an index that measured the cost of funds to large global banks operating in London financial markets or with London-based counterparties. Each day, the BBA surveyed a panel of banks (18 major global banks for the USD Libor), asking the question, "At what rate could you borrow funds, were you to do so by asking for and then accepting interbank offers in a reasonable market size just prior to 11 am?" The BBA threw out the highest four and lowest four responses, and averaged the remaining middle ten, yielding a 22% trimmed mean. The average was reported at 11:30 am.

Libor was actually a set of indexes. There were separate Libor rates reported for seven different maturities (length of time to repay a debt) for each of five currencies. The shortest maturity was overnight, the longest one year. In the United States, many private contracts referenced the three-month dollar Libor, which was the index resulting from asking the panel what rate they would pay to borrow dollars for three months.

=== Currency ===
In 1986, the Libor initially fixed rates for three currencies. These were the US dollar, British pound sterling, and the Deutsche Mark. Over time, this grew to sixteen currencies. After a number of these currencies merged into the euro in 2000, there remained ten currencies. Following reforms in 2013, Libor rates were calculated for five currencies.

Active until June 2023

- US dollar (USD)

Inactive from December 2021

- Euro (EUR)
- British pound sterling (GBP)
- Japanese yen (JPY)
- Swiss franc (CHF)

Inactive from 2013

- Australian dollar (AUD)
- Canadian dollar (CAD)
- New Zealand dollar (NZD)
- Danish krone (DKK)
- Swedish krona (SEK)

Note that the Euro LIBOR should not be confused with EURIBOR.

=== Maturities ===
Until 1998, the shortest duration rate was one month, after which the rate for one week was added. In 2001, rates for a day and two weeks were introduced. Following reforms in 2013, Libor rates were calculated for 7 maturities.

Active until June 2023

- 1 day
- 1 month
- 3 months
- 6 months
- 12 months

Inactive from December 2021

- 1 week
- 2 months

Inactive from 2013

- 2 weeks
- 4 months
- 5 months
- 7 months
- 8 months
- 9 months
- 10 months
- 11 months

== Libor-based derivatives ==
=== Libor futures ===
GBP and CHF LIBOR futures were traded on Intercontinental Exchange (ICE) and on CurveGlobal, part of the London Stock Exchange Group. USD LIBOR futures (aka Eurodollar futures) were traded on the Chicago Mercantile Exchange. JPY LIBOR futures (Euroyen futures) were traded on the Tokyo Financial Exchange and the Chicago Mercantile Exchange.

=== Interest rate swaps ===
Interest rate swaps based on short Libor rates traded on the interbank market for maturities up to 50 years. In the swap market, a "five-year Libor" rate referred to the five-year swap rate, where the floating leg of the swap referenced the three- or six-month Libor (this can be expressed more precisely as for example "5-year rate vs 6-month Libor"). "Libor + x basis points", when talking about a bond, meant that the bond's cash flows were discounted on the swaps' zero-coupon yield curve shifted by x basis points to equal the bond's actual market price. The day count convention for Libor rates in interest rate swaps was Actual/360, except for the GBP, for which it was Actual/365 (fixed).

== Reliability and scandal ==
On Thursday, 29 May 2008, The Wall Street Journal (WSJ) released a controversial study suggesting that banks might have understated borrowing costs they reported for Libor during the 2008 credit crunch. Such under-reporting could have created an impression that banks could borrow from other banks more cheaply than they could in reality. It could also have made the banking system or specific contributing bank appear healthier than it was during the 2008 credit crunch. For example, the study found that rates at which one major bank (Citigroup) "said it could borrow dollars for three months were about 0.87 percentage points lower than the rate calculated using default-insurance data."

In September 2008, a former member of the Bank of England's Monetary Policy Committee, Willem Buiter, described Libor as "the rate at which banks don't lend to each other", and called for its replacement. The former Governor of the Bank of England, Mervyn King, later used the same description before the Treasury Select Committee.

To further bring this case to light, The Wall Street Journal reported in March 2011 that regulators were focusing on Bank of America, Citigroup, and UBS. Making a case would be very difficult, because the Libor rate was not determined on an open exchange. According to people familiar with the situation, subpoenas were issued to the three banks.

In response to the study released by the WSJ, the British Bankers' Association announced that Libor continued to be reliable even in times of financial crisis. According to the British Bankers' Association, other proxies for financial health, such as the default-credit-insurance market, are not necessarily more sound than Libor at times of financial crisis, though they are more widely used in Latin America, especially the Ecuadorian and Bolivian markets.

Additionally, some other authorities contradicted the Wall Street Journal article. In its March 2008 Quarterly Review, The Bank for International Settlements stated that "available data do not support the hypothesis that contributor banks manipulated their quotes to profit from positions based on fixings." In October 2008, the International Monetary Fund published its regular Global Financial Stability Review, which also found that, "although the integrity of the U.S. dollar Libor-fixing process has been questioned by some market participants and the financial press, it appears that U.S. dollar Libor remains an accurate measure of a typical creditworthy bank's marginal cost of unsecured U.S. dollar term funding."

On 27 July 2012, the Financial Times published an article by a former trader that stated Libor manipulation had been common since at least 1991. Further reports followed from the BBC and Reuters. On 28 November 2012, the Finance Committee of the Bundestag held a hearing to learn more about the issue.

In late September 2012, Barclays was fined £290m because of its attempts to manipulate the Libor, and other banks were under investigation of having acted similarly. Financial Services Authority (FSA) managing director Martin Wheatley called for the British Bankers' Association to lose its power to determine Libor and for the FSA to be able to impose criminal sanctions as well as other changes in a ten-point overhaul plan.

The British Bankers' Association said on 25 September that it would transfer oversight of LIBOR to UK regulators, as proposed by Wheatley and CEO-designate of the new Financial Conduct Authority.

On 28 September, Wheatley's independent review was published, recommending that an independent organisation with government and regulator representation, called the Tender Committee, manage the process of setting LIBOR under a new external oversight process for transparency and accountability. Banks that made submissions to LIBOR would be required to base them on actual inter-bank deposit market transactions and keep records of their transactions supporting those submissions. The review also recommended that individual banks' LIBOR submissions be published, but only after three months, to reduce the risk that they would be used as a measure of the submitting banks' creditworthiness. The review left open the possibility that regulators might compel additional banks to participate in submissions if an insufficient number do voluntarily. The review recommended criminal sanctions specifically for manipulation of benchmark interest rates such as the LIBOR, saying that existing criminal regulations for manipulation of financial instruments were inadequate. LIBOR rates could have become higher and more volatile after implementation of these reforms, so financial institution customers could have faced higher and more volatile borrowing and hedging costs. The UK government agreed to accept all of the Wheatley Review's recommendations and press for legislation implementing them.

Bloomberg LP CEO Dan Doctoroff told the European Parliament that Bloomberg LP could develop an alternative index called the Bloomberg Interbank Offered Rate that would use data from transactions such as market-based quotes for credit default swap transactions and corporate bonds.

=== Criminal investigations ===
On 28 February 2012, it was revealed that the US Department of Justice was conducting a criminal investigation into Libor abuse. Among the abuses being investigated were the possibility that traders were in direct communication with bankers before the rates were set, thus allowing them an advantage in predicting that day's fixing. Libor underpinned approximately $350 trillion in derivatives. One trader's messages indicated that for each basis point (0.01%) that Libor was moved, those involved could net "about a couple of million dollars".

On 27 June 2012, Barclays Bank was fined $200m by the Commodity Futures Trading Commission, $160m by the United States Department of Justice and £59.5m by the Financial Services Authority for attempted manipulation of the Libor and Euribor rates. The United States Department of Justice and Barclays officially agreed that "the manipulation of the submissions affected the fixed rates on some occasions". On 2 July 2012, Marcus Agius, chairman of Barclays, resigned from the position following the interest rate rigging scandal. Bob Diamond, the chief executive officer of Barclays, resigned on 3 July 2012. Marcus Agius was to fill his post until a replacement was found. Jerry del Missier, chief operating officer of Barclays, also resigned. Del Missier subsequently admitted that he had instructed his subordinates to submit falsified LIBORs to the British Bankers Association.

By 4 July 2012, the breadth of the scandal was evident and became the topic of analysis on news and financial programs that attempted to explain the importance of the scandal. On 6 July, it was announced that the UK Serious Fraud Office had also opened a criminal investigation into the attempted manipulation of interest rates.

On 4 October 2012, Republican US Senators Chuck Grassley and Mark Kirk announced that they were investigating Treasury Secretary Timothy Geithner for complicity with the rate manipulation scandal. They accused Geithner of knowledge of the rate-fixing, and inaction which contributed to litigation that "threatens to clog our courts with multi-billion dollar class action lawsuits" alleging that the manipulated rates harmed state, municipal, and local governments. The senators said that an American-based interest rate index would be a better alternative and that they would take steps towards creating one.

At leat 19 individuals were subsequently convicted in the United Kingdom and United States on charges of conspiring to commit fraud. However, the US Court of Appeals for the Second Circuit in 2022 overturned the convictions of Matthew Connolly and Gavin Campbell Black on the grounds that the cases had not demonstrated that the manipulated Libor submissions were in fact false submissions. This led to other similar convictions in the United States being overturned. In the United Kingdom, the Supreme Court on 23 July 2025 allowed the appeals of Tom Hayes (originally convicted in 2015) and Carlo Palombo (2019), saying their convictions were unsafe because "It was wrong for the judge to direct the jury that, if the submitter took any account of the commercial interests of the bank or a trader, the rate submitted was for that reason not a genuine or honest answer to the question posed by the [LIBOR or EURIBOR] definitions as a matter of law".

=== Aftermath ===
Early estimates are that the rate manipulation scandal cost US states, counties, and local governments at least $6 billion in fraudulent interest payments, above the $4 billion that state and local governments spent to unwind their positions exposed to rate manipulation.

=== Reforms ===
The administration of Libor itself became a regulated activity overseen by the UK's Financial Conduct Authority. Furthermore, knowingly or deliberately making false or misleading statements in relation to benchmark-setting was made a criminal offence in UK law under the Financial Services Act 2012.

The Danish, Swedish, Canadian, Australian, and New Zealand Libor rates were terminated.

From the end of July 2013, only five currencies and seven maturities were quoted every day (35 rates), reduced from 150 different Libor rates – 15 maturities for each of ten currencies, making it more likely that the rates submitted were underpinned by real trades.

From the beginning of July 2013, each individual submission that came in from the banks was embargoed for three months to reduce the motivation to submit a false rate to portray a flattering picture of creditworthiness.

A new code of conduct, introduced by a new interim oversight committee, built on this by outlining the systems and controls firms had to have in place around Libor. For example, each bank had to have a named person responsible for Libor, accountable if there is any wrongdoing. The banks had to keep records so that they could be audited by the regulators if necessary.

In early 2014, NYSE Euronext took over the administration of Libor from the British Bankers Association. The new administrator was NYSE Euronext Rates Administration Limited, a London-based, UK registered company, regulated by the UK's Financial Conduct Authority.

On 13 November 2013, the Intercontinental Exchange (ICE) Group announced the successful completion of its acquisition of NYSE Euronext. As a result of this acquisition, NYSE Euronext Rate Administration Limited was renamed ICE Benchmark Administration Limited. The appointment of a new administrator was a major step forward in the reform of LIBOR.

The scandal also led to the European Commission proposal of EU-wide benchmark regulation.

Following its cessation, industry publication Financial News noted there were "an army of bankers, lawyers and traders" devoted to working on the transition that would need to change their focus given the switch to a new benchmark, even as there would be other jurisdictions and currencies moving off other inter-bank lending rates in years ahead.

== LIBOR cessation and alternatives available ==
Due to multiple factors, including the Libor scandal, concerns about the rates' accuracy, and changes in how banks do business, the decision was made to phase out Libor. Most LIBOR settings were to stop being issued or become unrepresentative at the end of 2021, while certain U.S. dollar settings would continue to be provided until the end of June 2023. The Financial Conduct Authority could continue to publish certain synthetic rates after these dates for loans that cannot easily be transitioned.

According to a March 2021 estimate, major banks would have to spend more than US$100 million (~$117 million in 2025) transitioning away from LIBOR. From January 2022, Libor could not be used as the reference rate in any new derivatives contracts, loans, and credit card offers.

A variety of replacements for LIBOR have been offered. In some cases, banks allow their customers to choose which rate to track.

=== Alternatives for the USD LIBOR ===
==== Alternative Reference Rates Committee ====
In 2014, the U.S. Federal Reserve Board and the Federal Reserve Bank of New York announced the creation of the Alternative Rates Reference Committee (ARRC) to assess viable alternatives to the LIBOR.

In 2016, the ARRC released its first report on the possible indices that could serve as a replacement to the LIBOR.

On March 7, 2018 the ARRC announced that the committee had been reconstituted and the following groups were participating.

The ARRC would comprise the following institutions:

- Axa
- Bank of America
- BlackRock
- Citigroup
- CME Group
- Deutsche Bank
- Federal National Mortgage Association
- Federal Home Loan Mortgage Corporation
- GE Capital
- Goldman Sachs
- Government Finance Officers Association
- HSBC
- Intercontinental Exchange
- International Swaps and Derivatives Association
- JPMorgan Chase
- LCH Clearnet
- MetLife
- Morgan Stanley
- National Association of Corporate Treasurers
- Pacific Investment Management Company
- TD Bank
- The Federal Home Loan Bank of New York
- The Independent Community Bankers of America
- The Loan Syndications and Trading Association
- The Securities Industry and Financial Markets Association
- Wells Fargo
- World Bank Group

In addition, the following agencies would serve as ex officio members of the ARRC:

- Board of Governors of the Federal Reserve System
- Consumer Financial Protection Bureau
- Federal Deposit Insurance Corporation
- Federal Housing Finance Agency
- Federal Reserve Bank of New York
- Office of Financial Research
- Office of the Comptroller of the Currency
- U.S. Commodity Futures Trading Commission
- U.S. Securities and Exchange Commission
- U.S. Treasury Department

==== Secured Overnight Financing Rate ====
In June 2017, the ARRC announced a broad Treasury repo financing rate, SOFR, as its recommended alternative to the USD LIBOR. In its justification for this choice the ARRC said:

SOFR is a fully transactions based rate that will have the widest coverage of any Treasury repo rate available and it will be published on a daily basis by the Federal Reserve Bank of New York beginning April 3, 2018. Because of its range of coverage, SOFR is a good representation of the general funding conditions of the overnight Treasury repo market. As such it will reflect an economic cost of lending and borrowing relevant to a wide array of market participants active in these markets, including broker dealers, money market funds, asset managers, insurance companies, securities lenders and pension funds.

==== Across-the-Curve Credit Spread Indices (AXI) ====
The Across-the-Curve Credit Spread Index (AXI) is a benchmark credit spread that captures the recent cost of wholesale, unsecured debt funding for publicly listed US bank holding companies and commercial banks. It can be used in conjunction with SOFR to form a robust credit-sensitive interest rate benchmark for bank lending and risk management. AXI is the weighted average of credit spreads for unsecured debt instruments with maturities ranging from overnight to five years, using weights that reflect both transaction and issuance volumes. The primary underlying input data source is the Financial Industry Regulatory Authority's Trade Reporting and Compliance Engine (TRACE), which is a mandatory post-trade reporting facility. This long-term bond component is supplemented by a short-term component using data from the Depository Trust & Clearing Corporation (DTCC). The Financial Conditions Credit Spread Index (FXI) follows the same methodology as AXI, but the underlying transactions are expanded beyond banks to include all financial institutions, as well as corporate funding transactions. AXI and FXI were first conceived by Antje Berndt, Darrell Duffie, and Yichao Zhu, and were operationalized by SOFR Academy, Inc. The US-dollar benchmark spreads were launched in 2022 and are published each business day by authorized benchmark administrator Invesco Indexing LLC, an independent index provider owned by global asset management firm Invesco. AXI and FXI are accessible via Bloomberg and Refinitiv / LSEG.

==== Ameribor ====
Ameribor is a benchmark interest rate created by the American Financial Exchange. Ameribor reflects the actual borrowing costs of thousands of small, medium, and regional banks across America, but it is also useful for larger banks and financial institutions that do business with these banks, as well as small and middle market companies. Ameribor has traded more than $550 billion (~$729 billion in 2025) since inception in 2015. In addition, the AFX launched Ameribor futures on August 16, 2019.

==== U.S. Dollar ICE Bank Yield Index ====
The U.S. Dollar ICE Bank Yield Index is an index proposed by Intercontinental Exchange Benchmark Administration (IBA) in January 2019 to measure the yields at which investors are willing to lend U.S. dollar funds to large, internationally active banks on a wholesale, unsecured basis over one-month, three-month and six-month periods. Its usage is intended to be similar to how Libor is currently used.

=== Alternatives for Yen LIBOR ===
Alternatives for Yen LIBOR include the Tokyo Overnight Average Rate (TONAR).

== See also ==
- Interbank lending market
- Libor scandal
- Euribor
- JIBAR
- LIBID
- Libor-OIS spread
- SHIBOR
- SONIA
- SOFR
- Ted spread
- TIBOR
- SIBOR
- HIBOR
- LIBOR market model
