= Arranger (banking) =

Person who funds the syndication of debt

In investment banking, an arranger is a provider of funds in the syndication of a debt. They are entitled to syndicate the loan or bond issue, and may be referred to as the "lead underwriter". This is because this entity bears the risk of being able to sell the underlying securities/debt or the cost of holding it on its books until such time in the future that they may be sold. They do not necessarily acquire all the debt - this may be split into various parts and sold to a variety of Arrangers.

Prior to the syndication of a loan and at the point where the loan documentation is signed, the title of "Bookrunner" is allocated to the bank that commits to provide the loan. This may be shared amongst several investors depending on the size of the deal. The "Arranger" is the entity (or entities) that subsequently agrees and negotiates the project financing structure. They will not necessarily be the same entity, although they often are.

Upon final signing of the full syndicate, the Bookrunner title may be forfeited to another lender. If amendments are made to the loan, the banks that committed to the original loan may retain their involvement in the deal as "Mandated Arrangers". The Bookrunner title is then assigned to the banks comprising the new lender group.

A bank may also be referred to as a "lead arranger", implying that they are more senior in the hierarchy of Arrangers involved in the deal.

For a coordinated series of bilaterals the Mandated Arranger title is allocated to the coordinators.
