= AMERIBOR =

Reference rate

The American Interbank Offered Rate (AMERIBOR), or simply Ameribor, is a reference rate for corporate borrowing costs for periods between 30 and 270 days. It is based on short-term funding data from the Depository Trust & Clearing Corporation.

== History ==
Introduced by Richard Sandor, who is known for creating interest-rate futures in the 1970s, Ameribor is determined on the American Financial Exchange. This is a platform where banks lend through mutual credit lines.

Ameribor serves as a competitive alternative to the Secured Overnight Financing Rate (SOFR), which only provides an overnight rate.

Ameribor is favored by smaller banks as it accurately represents the fund trading costs for banks outside the Federal Reserve's primary dealers. These banks often lack access to repo markets.
