= Syndicated loan =

Loan provided by a group of lenders

A syndicated loan is one that is provided by a group of lenders and is structured, arranged, and administered by one or several commercial banks or investment banks known as lead arrangers.

The syndicated loan market is the dominant way for large corporations in the U.S. and Europe to receive loans from banks and other institutional financial capital providers. Financial law often regulates the industry. The U.S. market originated with the large leveraged buyout loans of the mid-1980s, and Europe's market blossomed with the launch of the euro in 1999.

At the most basic level, arrangers serve the investment-banking role of raising investor funding for a business in need of capital. In this context the business is often referred to as an “issuer”, because in return for the loan it issues debentures (which are generally secured and transferable).

The issuer pays the arranger a fee for arranging the deal. Fees increase with the complexity and risk of the loan: the most remunerative loans are therefore those arranged for “leveraged borrowers” — issuers whose credit ratings are speculative grade because they are paying spreads sufficient to attract the interest of non-bank, term-loan investors. The threshold spread varies depending on market conditions. (“Spread” refers to the difference between the lowest interest rate an issuer can obtain, and a reference “risk-free” rate: for example SOFR in the U.S., or Euribor in Europe.)

== Loan market overview ==
The retail market for a syndicated loan consists of banks and in the case of leveraged transactions, finance companies and institutional investors. The balance of power among these different investor groups is different in the U.S. than in Europe. The U.S. has a capital market where pricing is linked to credit quality and institutional investor appetite. In Europe, although institutional investors have increased their market presence over the past decade, banks remain a key part of the market. Consequently, pricing is not fully driven by capital market forces.

In the U.S., market flex language drives initial pricing levels. Before formally launching a loan to these retail accounts, arrangers will often get a market read by informally polling select investors to gauge their appetite for the credit. After this market read, the arrangers will launch the deal at a spread and fee that it thinks will clear the market. Once the pricing, or the initial spread over a base rate (usually LIBOR), was set, it was largely fixed, except in the most extreme cases. If the loans were undersubscribed, the arrangers could very well be left above their desired hold level. Since the 1998 Russian financial crisis roiled the market, however, arrangers have adopted market-flex contractual language, which allows them to change the pricing of the loan based on investor demand — in some cases within a predetermined range — and to shift amounts between various tranches of a loan. This is now a standard feature of syndicated loan commitment letters.

As a result of market flex, loan syndication functions as a book-building exercise, in bond-market parlance. A loan is originally launched to market at a target spread or, as was increasingly common by 2008 with a range of spreads referred to as price talk (i.e., a target spread of, say, LIBOR+250 to LIBOR+275). Investors then will make commitments that in many cases are tiered by the spread. For example, an account may put in for $25 million at LIBOR+275 or $15 million at LIBOR+250. At the end of the process, the arranger will total up the commitments and then make a call on where to price the paper. Following the example above, if the paper is vastly oversubscribed at LIBOR+250, the arranger may slice the spread further. Conversely, if it is undersubscribed even at LIBOR+275, then the arranger will be forced to raise the spread to bring more money to the table.

In Europe, banks have historically dominated the debt markets because of the intrinsically regional nature of the arena. Regional banks have traditionally funded local and regional enterprises because they are familiar with regional issuers and can fund the local currency. Since the Eurozone was formed in 1998, the growth of the European leveraged loan market has been fuelled by the efficiency provided by this single currency as well as an overall growth in merger & acquisition (M&A) activity, particularly leveraged buyouts due to private equity activity. Regional barriers (and sensitivities toward consolidation across borders) have fallen, economies have grown and the euro has helped to bridge currency gaps.

As a result, in Europe, more and more leveraged buyouts have occurred over the past decade and, more significantly, they have grown in size as arrangers have been able to raise bigger pools of capital to support larger, multi-national transactions. To fuel this growing market, a broader array of banks from multiple regions now fund these deals, along with European institutional investors and U.S. institutional investors, resulting in the creation of a loan market that crosses the Atlantic.

The European market has taken advantage of many of the lessons from the U.S. market, while maintaining its regional diversity. In Europe, the regional diversity allows banks to maintain a significant lending influence and fosters private equity's dominance in the market.

== Types of syndications ==
Globally, there are three types of underwriting for syndications: an underwritten deal, best-efforts syndication, and a club deal. The European leveraged syndicated loan market almost exclusively consists of underwritten deals, whereas the U.S. market contains mostly best-efforts.

=== Underwritten deal ===
An underwritten deal is one for which the arrangers guarantee the entire commitment, then syndicate the loan. If the arrangers cannot fully subscribe the loan, they are forced to absorb the difference, which they may later try to sell to investors. This is easy, of course, if market conditions, or the credit's fundamentals, improve. If not, the arranger may be forced to sell at a discount and, potentially, even take a loss on the paper. Or the arranger may just be left above its desired hold level of the credit.

Arrangers underwrite loans for several reasons. First, offering an underwritten loan can be a competitive tool to win mandates. Second, underwritten loans usually require more lucrative fees because the agent is on the hook if potential lenders balk. Of course, with flex-language now common, underwriting a deal does not carry the same risk it once did when the pricing was set in stone prior to syndication.

=== Best-efforts syndication ===
A best-efforts syndication is one for which the arranger group commits to underwrite less than or equal to the entire amount of the loan, leaving the credit to the vicissitudes of the market. If the loan is undersubscribed, the credit may not close — or may need significant adjustments to its interest rate or credit rating to clear the market. Traditionally, best-efforts syndications were used for risky borrowers or for complex transactions. However, since the late 1990s, the rapid acceptance of market-flex language has made best-efforts loans the rule even for investment-grade transactions.

=== Club deal ===
A club deal is a smaller loan — usually $25‒100 million, but as high as $150 million — that is premarketed to a group of relationship lenders. The arranger is generally a first among equals, and each lender gets a full cut, or nearly a full cut, of the fees.

== The syndication process ==
As a syndicated loan is a collection of bilateral loans between a borrower and several banks, the structure of the transaction is to isolate each bank's interest whilst maximising the collective efficiency of monitoring and enforcement of a single lender. The essence is to make loans on similar terms to make a bundle of loans into a single agreement. This draws upon Loan Market Association documents. Correspondingly, three key actors operate within a syndicated lending:

- Arranger
- Agent
- Trustee

These actors utilise two core legal concepts to overcome the difficulty of large-cap lending, those being Agency and Trusts. A single bank may not on its own be willing or able to advance the whole amount. The essence of syndication is that two or more banks agree to make loans to a borrower on common terms governed by a single agreement. This agreement not only regulates the relationship between the lenders and the borrower but importantly between lenders. Most loans are documented using LMA precedents, in England, this will not be on the lenders' 'written standard terms of business' for the purposes of UCTA 1977.

The distinction in the lending agreements, and use of the three aforementioned actors is primarily to avoid the creation of a partnership, avoid lenders from inadvertently acting as guarantors to one another — or to prevent Set-off. The borrower is sometimes given a “Yank the bank” power to force a transfer of a lenders interest in repayment (a chose in action) if the lender does not consent to a waiver or amendment. Lenders are traditionally limited in their decision-making by overlapping clauses requiring voting and collective decision-making. This acts as a disincentive for individual lenders to act in their own interests over the collective group. It has been suggested that the historical cooperation within the London loan market helped produce efficiency insolvency work-outs through the London Approach.

=== Lending Terms ===
There are several common types of lending terms, including implied terms in syndicated lending that affect the operation and coordination of lending behaviour.

- Snooze-you-lose provision where lenders are required to submit their votes, these are contractual discretions which allow . These were found within several cases which regard terms relating to contractual discretions which must be exercised for the purposes which they are conferred.
- Good Faith.

=== Participants ===
Within the banking sector, the role of setting up syndicated loans differ from deal to deal but generally a handful of key actors are consistent. These were the aforementioned key actors of the arranging bank, the agent, and the trustee.

==== Arranging Bank ====
The arranging bank acts as a salesman, and may be cannot exclude liability in its role of representing the agreement; either through misrepresentation, negligence, or breach of fiduciary duty. It may also be liable if it fails to do its best endeavours to acquire lending parties, these vary depending on the law of representation and fiduciary duty within national law. Syndication is generally initiated by the grant of a mandate by the borrower to the arranging bank(s) or ‘lead managers’ setting out the financial terms of the proposed loan. The financial terms are set out in a “term sheet” which states the amount, term of the loan, repayment schedule, interest margin, fees any special terms, and a general statement that the loan will contain representations and warranties. This might include terms which relate to when the loan is to finance a company acquisition or a large infrastructure project, conferring interests in the lenders. Often term sheets are made to be expressly non-binding. However, in Maple Leaf Macro Volatility Master Fund v Rouvroy (2009) a loan term sheet was held to create a contract.

==== Agent ====
The core function of the Agent is to act as a conduit between the borrowers and the lenders. The agent owes contractual duties both to the borrower AND to the lenders. In TORRE ASSET FUNDING v RBS (2013) the mezzanine lenders alleged it was the Agent's duty to inform them of when an event of default occurred. The relationship of the agent tends not to be a fiduciary one. The essence of a fiduciary relationship is that they may be reasonably expected to subordinate their own commercial interests to that of their beneficiary, in English law, this is not representative of a banking relationship. They are;

- Not fiduciaries
- No advisory duty as agent bank's duties are ‘solely mechanical and administrative in nature’.

The agent bank's express duty, is to provide information designed to enable lenders to consider how to exercise their right under various facility agreements in relation to accelerating the debt, not to assist with ‘exit’ or liability for misstatements. As set out in Torre, the agent is typically a conduit between borrowers and lenders. They are typically described as solely technical and owe no fiduciary. They hold no duty to advise and are not liable for negligence.

==== Trustee ====
Security will usually be held by a trustee, as is common within Bond issuances on behalf of the lenders. This makes taking security easier, since there is a single chargee which is unlikely to change through the duration of the loan (through the secondary market). In jurisdictions where the trust is not recognised, it is often addressed by parallel debt provisions stating that the amount outstanding is deemed to be owing to the security trustee but will be reduced by any amounts actually received by the syndicate members.

- Duty to enforce security under an event of default, or instruction by lenders
- valuation and described as solely technical. They are fiduciary for lenders but not necessarily all lenders.

Trustee duties cannot be fully excluded, core of that is fiduciary. Some discretion and good faith is sufficient. Statutory regulation is not desired, as doing so will likely limit the number willing trustees.

=== Sub-participation ===
There are normally no express restrictions on sub-participations. Banks usually exclude the requirement for consent if there has been an event of default to enable the bank to sell a defaulted loan without consent from the borrower. Similarly the requirement for consent is often excluded if the assignment is to an affiliate of an existing lender. Bank which has been a loan and not been repaid holds an asset comprising the debt of the borrower. Lead bank to engage in such asset sales relate inter alia to over exposure, regulatory capital requirements, liquidity, and arbitrage.

Transfer provisions in syndicated loan agreement set up procedures under which all the parties to the loan agreement agree that if a lender and a transferee (i) agree upon a transfer of all or part of the lender’s interest (ii) record the agreement but not the price or other ancillary matters which are to be dealt with separately and (iii) deliver this to the agent bank, the transfer will take effect. The effect of the transfer is that the transferee becomes a party to the agreement with rights and obligations which are the same — the identity of the parties expected — as those the ‘transferor’ had before the transfer. […] can be structured to give the borrower total or partial control over the type or identity of specific transferees or classes.

Assignments may be permitted to assignees who satisfy stipulated criteria or who are included on a list of permitted assignees (a so-called ‘white list’) or are not on a list of prohibited assignees (a ‘black list’). The borrower's liabilities are not to be increased as a result of an assignment or change of lending office: under the tax grossing-up or increased cost clauses.

Syndicated credits generally contain a provision whereby a bank may novate its rights and obligations to another bank. The object of the novation is to ensure a transfer of obligations of the bank to lend; without this transfer releasing the original bank, the original bank may have a continuing credit exposure to the transferee bank if the transferee bank fails to make a new loan to the borrower when required by the loan agreement and this exposure may attract a capital adequacy requirement. Novation may amount to a complete substitution of the new bank or rather as an assignment of the rights of the old bank and the assumption by the new bank of obligations under the loan agreement plus the release of the old bank. The difference between the two is that a novation cancels old loans completely (which might have adverse effects on any security for the loan unless held by a trustee for the banks) whereas an assignment and assumption preserves the old loans and their security. Other obligations of a bank which may be transferred in this way are obligations to indemnify the agent and obligations under a pro rata sharing clause. In the case of assignments of rights, it may be a requirement that the assignee assumes these obligations to the existing banks.

The contractual mechanics of the novation are that the agent bank is authorised by the borrower and the banks in the credit agreement to sign the scheduled novation certificates on behalf of the borrower and the banks so that all parties are bound.

=== Conflict between Lenders ===
There are four potential causes of conflicts between lenders:

==== Co-ordination ====
Decision making requires coordination. Bonds are widely dispersed and the holder's identity is often unknown to the issuer or other bond holders due to the intermediate holding of securities. Scheme of arrangement require majority in number (head-count test) whereas if bonds are issued on a global note there is only one true creditor with sub participation through trusts. The solution to this problem is to develop inter-creditor agreements. To overcome the head-count test issues in bonds: bondholders can be given definite notes (although costly) or on the basis of this right be perceived as contingent-creditors.

==== Tragedy of the Commons ====
Hardin writes that Individual management and enforcement of the loans/bond increases individual monitoring costs, enforcement costs and facilities wealth destruction due to premature acceleration of loan/bond and enforcement of security. Collective issues can be addressed again by the inter-creditor agreements. Management and enforcement is in principle vested in a single individual in order to reduce monitoring costs and value distraction. This is a crucial concept within insolvency, which is primarily concerned with

1. BONDS: Individual action by bond holders is not allowed. This is personified by a no-action clause unless the trustee fails to enforce within a reasonable time of instruction. No-action clauses can be seen as a contractual variant of Vanderpitte procedure( a beneficiary can force a party to bring an action by bringing an action against the trustee). A bond trustee is obliged to enforce if;
- event of default
- certification of material prejudice
- instruction from bond holders; and
- satisfactory indemnity
1. SYNDICATED; Security trustees within these situations are obliged to enforce upon an event of default AND majority instructions. Individual action by a lender is possible because their rights are several and not joint. However, they do not have the benefit of security as it is vested in the strictly trustee. The result is that the realisation of the security to pay off the called debt (if not all parties are calling the debt) is shared severally pro rata. This discourages parties from realising the debt. This is found within a ‘pro-rata sharing clause’ by forcing individual lenders to share individual recoveries which reduces incentive to cut-the-line behaviour.

==== Tragedy of the anti-commons ====
As we have outlined above, veto-rights of individual bond holders/lenders can lead to sub-optimal outcomes. For example, a proper restructuring benefitting everyone is blocked. A solution to this problem is restrictions on agreements based on majorities. Majority can bind a minority, with the exception of some ‘all lenders matters’. In case of loans, majority lenders typically defined as 50% or 75% of value based on commitments. Non-consenting banks can sometimes be forced to transfer. This was observed in the Yank-the-bank clause outlined above.

==== Minority oppression & prisoners dilemma ====
Majority might oppress minority bond holders/lenders. Coordination problems lead to lenders to prefer sub-optimal options, because it is the safest option but not necessarily the best. Two forms of protections exist to prevent minority oppression. Several concepts have been outlined above and below, but it will be useful to be summarised here in order to appreciate the two primary methods of lenders within minority positions.

1. Transfer:

Minority lenders who feel oppressed may choose to transfer their debts to other, although conflict might limit the number of buyers willing to reduce price of the loan/bonds.

1. Implied term:

It is an implied term in loan and bond agreements that the majority must act in good faith and for the purpose of benefiting the class as a whole. Subject to the express terms of contract. Where there are different classes, there is no need to vote in interests of the creditor as a whole. Therefore, in last year's exam, the subordinated nature of the second lender meant that there was a different class and the first group could call the debt without consequence of the second group being hesitant.

== Leveraged Transaction ==
Leveraged transactions fund a number of purposes. They provide support for general corporate purposes, including capital expenditures, working capital, and expansion. They refinance the existing capital structure or support a full recapitalization including, not infrequently, the payment of a dividend to the equity holders. They provide funding to corporations undergoing restructurings, including bankruptcy, in the form of super senior loans also known as debtor in possession (DIP) loans. Their primary purpose, however, is to fund M&A activity, specifically leveraged buyouts, where the buyer uses the debt markets to acquire the acquisition target's equity.

In the U.S., the core of leveraged lending comes from buyouts resulting from corporate activity, while, in Europe, private equity funds drive buyouts. In the U.S., all private equity related activities, including refinancings and recapitalizations, are called sponsored transactions; in Europe, they are referred to as LBOs.

A buyout transaction originates well before lenders see the transaction's terms. In a buyout, the company is first put up for auction. With sponsored transactions, a company that is for the first time up for sale to private equity sponsors is a primary LBO; a secondary LBO is one that is going from one sponsor to another sponsor, and a tertiary is one that is going for the second time from sponsor to sponsor. A public-to-private transaction (P2P) occurs when a company is going from the public domain to a private equity sponsor.

As prospective acquirers are evaluating target companies, they are also lining up debt financing. A staple financing package may be on offer as part of the sale process. By the time the auction winner is announced, that acquirer usually has funds linked up via a financing package funded by its designated arranger, or, in Europe, mandated lead arranger (MLA).

Before awarding a mandate, an issuer might solicit bids from arrangers. The banks will outline their syndication strategy and qualifications, as well as their view on the way the loan will price in market. Once the mandate is awarded, the syndication process starts.

In Europe, where mezzanine capital funding is a market standard, issuers may choose to pursue a dual track approach to syndication whereby the MLAs handle the senior debt and a specialist mezzanine fund oversees placement of the subordinated mezzanine position.

The arranger will prepare an information memo (IM) describing the terms of the transactions. The IM typically will include an executive summary, investment considerations, a list of terms and conditions, an industry overview, and a financial model. Because loans are unregistered securities, this will be a confidential offering made only to qualified banks and accredited investors. If the issuer is speculative grade and seeking capital from nonbank investors, the arranger will often prepare a "public" version of the IM. This version will be stripped of all confidential material such as management financial projections so that it can be viewed by accounts that operate on the public side of the wall or that want to preserve their ability to buy bonds or stock or other public securities of the particular issuer (see the Public Versus Private section below). Naturally, investors that view materially nonpublic information of a company are disqualified from buying the company's public securities for some period of time. As the IM (or "bank book", in traditional market lingo) is being prepared, the syndicate desk will solicit informal feedback from potential investors on what their appetite for the deal will be and at what price they are willing to invest. Once this intelligence has been gathered, the agent will formally market the deal to potential investors.

The executive summary will include a description of the issuer, an overview of the transaction and rationale, sources and uses, and key statistics on the financials. Investment considerations will be, basically, management's sales "pitch" for the deal.

The list of terms and conditions will be a preliminary term sheet describing the pricing, structure, collateral, covenants, and other terms of the credit (covenants are usually negotiated in detail after the arranger receives investor feedback).

The industry overview will be a description of the company's industry and competitive position relative to its industry peers.

The financial model will be a detailed model of the issuer's historical, pro forma, and projected financials including management's high, low, and base case for the issuer.

Most new acquisition-related loans are kicked off at a bank meeting at which potential lenders hear management and the sponsor group (if there is one) describe what the terms of the loan are and what transaction it backs. Management will provide its vision for the transaction and, most importantly, tell why and how the lenders will be repaid on or ahead of schedule. In addition, investors will be briefed regarding the multiple exit strategies, including second ways out via asset sales. (If it is a small deal or a refinancing instead of a formal meeting, there may be a series of calls or one-on-one meetings with potential investors.)

In Europe, the syndication process has multiple steps reflecting the complexities of selling down through regional banks and investors. The roles of each of the players in each of the phases are based on their relationships in the market and access to paper. On the arrangers’ side, the players are determined by how well they can access capital in the market and bring in lenders. On the lenders' side, it is about getting access to as many deals as possible.

There are three primary phases of syndication in Europe. During the underwriting phase, the sponsor or corporate borrowers designate the MLA (or the group of MLAs) and the deal is initially underwritten. During the sub-underwriting phases, other arrangers are brought into the deal. In general syndication, the transaction is opened up to the institutional investor market, along with other banks that are interested in participating.

In the U.S. and in Europe, once the loan is closed, the final terms are then documented in detailed credit and security agreements. Subsequently, liens are perfected and collateral is attached.

Loans, by their nature, are flexible documents that can be revised and amended from time to time after they have closed. These amendments require different levels of approval. Amendments can range from something as simple as a covenant waiver to something as complex as a change in the collateral package or allowing the issuer to stretch out its payments or make an acquisition.

== Loan market participants ==
There are three primary-investor constituencies: banks, finance companies, and institutional investors; in Europe, only the banks and institutional investors are active.

In Europe, the banking segment is almost exclusively made up of commercial banks, while in the U.S. it is much more diverse and can involve commercial and investments banks, business development corporations or finance companies, and institutional investors such as asset managers, insurance companies and loan mutual funds and loan ETFs. As in Europe, commercial banks in the U.S. provide the vast majority of investment-grade loans. These are typically large revolving credits that back commercial paper or are used for general corporate purposes or, in some cases, acquisitions.

For leveraged loans, considered non-investment grade risk, U.S. and European banks typically provide the revolving credits, letters of credit (L/Cs), and — although they are becoming increasingly less common — fully amortizing term loans known as "Term Loan A" under a syndicated loan agreement while institutions provide the partially amortizing term loans known a "Term Loan B".

Finance companies have consistently represented less than 10% of the leveraged loan market, and tend to play in smaller deals — $25–200 million. These investors often seek asset-based loans that carry wide spreads and that often feature time-intensive collateral monitoring.

Institutional investors in the loan market are principally structured vehicles known as collateralized loan obligations (CLO) and loan participation mutual funds (known as "prime funds" because they were originally pitched to investors as a money-market-like fund that would approximate the prime rate) also play a large role. Although U.S. prime funds do make allocations to the European loan market, there is no European version of prime funds because European regulatory bodies, such as the Financial Services Authority (FSA) in the U.K., have not approved loans for retail investors.

In addition, hedge funds, high-yield bond funds, pension funds, insurance companies, and other proprietary investors do participate opportunistically in loans. Typically, however, they invest principally in wide-margin loans (referred to by some players as "high-octane" loans), with spreads of 500 basis points or higher over the base rate.

CLOs are special-purpose vehicles set up to hold and manage pools of leveraged loans. The special-purpose vehicle is financed with several tranches of debt (typically a ‘AAA’ rated tranche, a ‘AA’ tranche, a ‘BBB’ tranche, and a mezzanine tranche with a non-investment grade rating) that have rights to the collateral and payment stream in descending order. In addition, there is an equity tranche, but the equity tranche is usually not rated. CLOs are created as arbitrage vehicles that generate equity returns through leverage, by issuing debt 10 to 11 times their equity contribution. There are also market-value CLOs that are less leveraged — typically three to five times — and allow managers more flexibility than more tightly structured arbitrage deals. CLOs are usually rated by two of the three major ratings agencies and impose a series of covenant tests on collateral managers, including minimum rating, industry diversification, and maximum default basket.

In U.S., before the financial crisis in 2007–2008, CLOs had become the dominant form of institutional investment in the leveraged loan market taking a commanding 60% of primary activity by institutional investors by 2007. But when the structured finance market cratered in late 2007, CLO issuance tumbled and by mid-2008, the CLO share had fallen to 40%. In 2014 CLO issuance has demonstrated a full recovery with issuance of $90 billion by August, an amount that effectively equals the previous record set in 2007. Projections on total issuance for 2014 are as high as $125 billion.

In Europe, over the past few years, other vehicles such as credit funds have begun to appear on the market. Credit funds are open-ended pools of debt investments. Unlike CLOs, however, they are not subject to ratings oversight or restrictions regarding industry or ratings diversification. They are generally lightly levered (two or three times), allow managers significant freedom in picking and choosing investments, and are subject to being marked to market.

In addition, in Europe, mezzanine funds play a significant role in the loan market. Mezzanine funds are also investment pools, which traditionally focused on the mezzanine market only. However, when second lien entered the market, it eroded the mezzanine market; consequently, mezzanine funds expanded their investment universe and began to commit to second lien as well as payment-in-kind (PIK) portions of transaction. As with credit funds, these pools are not subject to ratings oversight or diversification requirements, and allow managers significant freedom in picking and choosing investments. Mezzanine funds are, however, riskier than credit funds in that they carry both debt and equity characteristics.

Retail investors can access the loan market through prime funds. Prime funds were first introduced in the late 1980s. Most of the original prime funds were continuously offered funds with quarterly tender periods. Managers then rolled true closed-end, exchange-traded funds in the early 1990s. It was not until the early 2000s that fund complexes introduced open-ended funds that were redeemable each day. While quarterly redemption funds and closed-end funds remained the standard because the secondary loan market does not offer the rich liquidity that is supportive of open-end funds, the open-end funds had sufficiently raised their profile that by mid-2008 they accounted for 15-20% of the loan assets held by mutual funds.

As the ranks of institutional investors have grown over the years, the loan markets have changed to support their growth. Institutional term loans have become commonplace in a credit structure. Secondary trading is a routine activity and mark-to-market pricing as well as leveraged loan indexes have become portfolio management standards.

== Credit facilities ==
Syndicated loans facilities (credit facilities) are basically financial assistance programs that are designed to help financial institutions and other institutional investors to draw notional amount as per the requirement.

There are four main types of syndicated loan facilities: a revolving credit; a term loan; an L/C; and an acquisition or equipment line (a delayed-draw term loan).

A revolving credit line allows borrowers to draw down, repay and reborrow as often as necessary. The facility acts much like a corporate credit card, except that borrowers are charged an annual commitment fee on unused amounts, which drives up the overall cost of borrowing (the facility fee). In the U.S., many revolvers to speculative-grade issuers are asset-based and thus tied to borrowing-base lending formulas that limit borrowers to a certain percentage of collateral, most often receivables and inventory. In Europe, revolvers are primarily designated to fund working capital or capital expenditures (capex).

A term loan is simply an installment loan, such as a loan one would use to buy a car. The borrower may draw on the loan during a short commitment period and repay it based on either a scheduled series of repayments or a one-time lump-sum payment at maturity (bullet payment). There are two principal types of term loans: an amortizing term loan and an institutional term loan.

An amortizing term loan (A-term loan or TLA) is a term loan with a progressive repayment schedule that typically runs six years or less. These loans are normally syndicated to banks along with revolving credits as part of a larger syndication. In the U.S., A-term loans have become increasingly rare over the years as issuers bypassed the bank market and tapped institutional investors for all or most of their funded loans.

An institutional term loan (B-term, C-term or D-term loan) is a term-loan facility with a portion carved out for nonbank, institutional investors. These loans became more common as the institutional loan investor base grew in the U.S. and Europe. These loans are priced higher than amortizing term loans because they have longer maturities and bullet repayment schedules. This institutional category also includes second-lien loans and covenant-lite loans.

== Regulatory compliance ==
The United States' Shared National Credit Program was established in 1977 by the Board of Governors of the Federal Reserve System, the Federal Deposit Insurance Corporation, and the Office of the Comptroller of the Currency to provide an efficient and consistent review and classification of large syndicated loans. As of January 1, 2018, the program covers any loan or loan complaint of at least $100 million that is shared by three or more supervised institutions. The agencies' review is conducted annually, reporting after third quarter examinations and reflecting data as of June 30.

== Corporate bond alternative ==
For firms seeking financing, issuing corporate bonds is a major alternative option to syndicated loans, as both allow for raising large amounts with medium to long-term maturities. In the 1990s, a standardized secondary marketplace emerged via products such as collateralized loan obligations (CLO), which made syndicated loans even more similar to corporate bonds.
