= London Interbank Bid Rate =

The London Interbank Bid Rate (LIBID) is a bid rate; the rate bid by banks on Eurocurrency deposits (i.e., the rate at which a bank is willing to borrow from other banks). It is the "other end" of the LIBOR (an offered, hence "ask" rate, the rate at which a bank will lend). Whilst the British Bankers' Association set LIBOR rates, there is no correspondent official LIBID fixing.

Conventional wisdom used to assert that a LIBID rate could be calculated by subtracting a fixed amount (often given as 1/8th of 1%) from the prevailing BBA LIBOR rate, however this is no longer the case as bid–offer spreads have tightened in recent years. Additionally, it cannot be the case that the LIBOR/LIBID spread is always 1/8th of 1% for all maturities and all currencies all the time.
