= Cartel Client Review =

Cartel Client Review Ltd. is a controversial firm based in Manchester, England that attempts to use loopholes to enable clients to write off loan agreements. The firm was investigated by the Ministry of Justice, and a firm of solicitors linked to the firm was shut down by regulators.
