= Floating interest rate =

Non-fixed interest rate over the term of a debt

A floating interest rate, also known as a variable or adjustable rate, refers to any type of debt instrument, such as a loan, bond, mortgage, or credit, that does not have a fixed rate of interest over the life of the instrument.

Floating interest rates typically change based on a reference rate (a benchmark of any financial factor, such as the Consumer Price Index). One of the most common reference rates to use as the basis for applying floating interest rates is the Secure Overnight Financing Rate, or SOFR.

The rate for such debt will usually be referred to as a spread or margin over the base rate: for example, a five-year loan may be priced at the six-month SOFR + 2.50%. At the end of each six-month period, the rate for the following period will be based on the SOFR at that point (the reset date), plus the spread. The basis will be agreed between the borrower and lender, but 1, 3, 6 or 12 month money market rates are commonly used for commercial loans.

Typically, floating rate loans will cost less than fixed rate loans, depending in part on the yield curve. In return for paying a lower loan rate, the borrower takes the interest rate risk: the risk that rates will go up in future. In cases where the yield curve is inverted, the cost of borrowing at floating rates may actually be higher; in most cases, however, lenders require higher rates for longer-term fixed-rate loans, because they are bearing the interest rate risk (risking that the rate will go up, and they will get lower interest income than they would otherwise have had).

Certain types of floating rate loans, particularly mortgages, may have other special features such as interest rate caps, or limits on the maximum interest rate or maximum change in the interest rate that is allowable.

== Floating rate loan ==
In business and finance, a floating rate loan (or a variable or adjustable rate loan) refers to a loan with a floating interest rate. The total rate paid by the customer varies, or "floats", in relation to some base rate. The term of the loan may be substantially longer than the basis from which the floating rate loan is priced; for example, a 25-year mortgage may be priced off the 6-month prime lending rate.

Floating rate loans are common in the banking industry and for large corporate customers. A floating rate mortgage is a mortgage with a floating rate, as opposed to a fixed rate loan.

In many countries, floating rate loans and mortgages are predominant. They may be referred to by different names, such as an adjustable-rate mortgage in the United States. In some countries, there may be no special name for this type of loan or mortgage, as floating rate lending may be the norm. For example, in Canada substantially all mortgages are floating rate mortgages; borrowers may choose to "fix" the interest rate for any period between six months and ten years, although the actual term of the loan may be 25 years or more.

Floating rate loans are sometimes referred to as bullet loans, although they are distinct concepts. In a bullet loan, a large payment (the "bullet" or "balloon") is payable at the end of the loan, as opposed to a capital and interest loan, where the payment pattern incorporates level payments throughout the loan, each containing an element of capital, and no bullet payment at the end. A floating rate loan therefore may or may not incorporate a bullet payment.

== Example ==
A customer borrows $25,000 from a bank; the terms of the loan are (six-month) SOFR + 3.5%. At the time of issuing the loan, the SOFR rate is 2.5%. For the first six months, the borrower pays the bank 6% annual interest: in this simplified case $750 for six months. At the end of the first six months, the SOFR rate has risen to 4%; the client will pay 7.5% (or $937.5) for the second half of the year. At the beginning of the second year, the SOFR rate has now fallen to 1.5%, and the borrowing costs are $500 for the following six months.
