= Yevgeny Gunst =

Russian musician

Yevgeny Ottovich Gunst (Russian: Евгений Оттович Гунст; May 26 (Julian) / June 7 (Gregorian), 1877–January 30, 1950) was a Russian composer, pianist, music essayist, and pedagogue. He was the brother of architect Anatoly Gunst.

== Biography ==
Gunst was born in Moscow to Otto Karlovich Gunst, a member of the State Council of Imperial Russia, who had German ancestors. He studied law as well as composition, music theory, and piano at the State Conservatory, as well as having private lessons with renowned composers like Reinhold Glière and Aleksandr Goldenweiser. In 1909, he co-founded the Moscow Chamber Music Theatre with Sergei Rachmaninoff, among others.

In 1920, Gunst had to emigrate to Tallinn (Estonia) before later settling down in Paris. There, he co-founded the Conservatoire Rachmaninoff in 1924 but had to leave in 1931 due to political differences. He founded his own conservatory but soon had to close it as the Great Depression was still ongoing. He worked as an arranger (banking) and copyist in Paris and became a close friend of Francis Poulenc. In 1949, Gunst was about to migrate to the United States, but he died in 1950 in Paris at the age of 72. His estate was found in 2009 in the basement of the University of Basel's Musicological Institute. Apparently, it was left undiscovered for many decades, as Gunst's widow had bestowed her husband's estate on the institute's director, at that time Jacques Handschin, in the 1950s.

== Notes ==
=== Free scores ===
- Free scores by Yevgeny Gunst at the International Music Score Library Project (IMSLP)
