= Fixed rate =

Fixed rate may refer to:

- Fixed-rate mortgage, a type of mortgage loan
- Fixed interest rate loan, a type of loan
- Fixed rate bond, a type of bond
