= TIIE =

Reference rate in Mexico

TIIE (Spanish: Tasa de interés interbancaria de equilibrio, English Interbank Equilibrium Interest Rate) is a reference rate for the currency Mexican peso. The TIIE is a representative rate of credit operations between banks and is calculated by the Bank of Mexico.

== History ==
In March 1995 the Bank of Mexico decided to publish the TIIE, in order to establish an interbank rate that reflects market conditions.

For this purpose, a procedure was established according to which the Bank of Mexico determines the TIIE with quotes presented by the credit institutions.

== Methodology ==
The TIIE is calculated by the Bank of Mexico on every bank business day for terms of 28, 91 and 182 days, based on quotes presented by banking institutions, through a mechanism designed to reflect the conditions of the money market in national currency.

Quotations must be submitted to the Bank's National Operations Management Mexico no later than 12:00 noon on the corresponding banking business day by SIAC. The quoted interest rates must be expressed in percentage terms rounded to four decimal places.

Get quotes from at least six Multiple Banking Institutions, proceed to calculate the corresponding TIIE using the procedure referred to in the circular.

The procedure requires quotes from at least six institutions. If that number of quotes is not met, the Bank of Mexico will determine the TIIE considering the prevailing conditions in the money market.

The general results will be available to the Multiple Banking Institutions no later than sixty minutes after the deadline for the submission of same-day quotes.

== Publication ==
The Bank of Mexico publishes the TIIE on its website and through the Official Journal of the Federation, on the bank business day immediately following the day on which it was determined.
