= S&P Leveraged Loan Index =

Financial market index

Morningstar LSTA US Leveraged Loan Index
- Foundation: 2001; 25 years ago
- Operator: Morningstar and Loan Syndications and Trading Association
- Trading symbol: SPBDAL
- Constituents: Invested institutional loan market
- Weighting method: Capitalization-weighted index
- Website: indexes.morningstar.com/indexes/details/morningstar-lsta-us-leveraged-loan-FS0000HS4A
- Bloomberg: SPBDLLB:US

Morningstar LSTA US Leveraged Loan Index (formerly S&P Leveraged Loan Indexes, S&P LL indexes) are a set of capitalization-weighted syndicated loan indexes based upon market weightings, spreads and interest payments.

The Morningstar LSTA US Leveraged Loan Index (SecId FOUSA06EPJ, formerly LLI) covers the U.S. market back to 1997 and calculates on a daily basis. The Morningstar LSTA US Leveraged Loan 100 Index (SecIdF00000NJIW, formerly LL100) dates back to 2002 and is a daily tradable index for the U.S. market that seeks to mirror the market-weighted performance of the largest institutional leveraged loans, as determined by criteria.

Its ticker on Bloomberg is SPBDLLB. These indexes are run in partnership between Morningstar and the Loan Syndications and Trading Association, the loan market’s trade group.

The Morningstar European Leveraged Loan Index (Secid F000011N8A, formerly ELLI) covers the European market back to 2003 and calculates on a weekly basis.

== History ==
=== Foundation ===
S&P introduced the LLI in 2001, including historical data back to January 1997. The ELLI was introduced in 2005 with history back to 2003. The LL100 was introduced in 2008 with history back to Dec. 31, 2001.

On its base date (Dec. 1, 1996), the LLI tracked 36 facilities representing $5.2 billion of loans. As of Dec. 31, 2009, it included 189 facilities representing $529.9 billion of loans. Over those 13 years, the LLI has had an average annualized total return of 6.7%.

On its base date (Jan. 1, 2002), the S&P European Loan Index tracked 12 facilities representing €2.6 billion of loans. As of Dec. 31, 2009, it encompassed 552 facilities representing €135.1 billion of loans. Over those seven years, the ELLI has had an average annualized total return of 3.6%.

The S&P/LSTA Loan 100 consists of 100 facilities drawn from the LLI. It seeks to mirror the market-weighted performance of the largest institutional leveraged loans in an effort to reflect the most liquid side of the market. On its base date, the LL100 represented $51.3 billion in loans. As of Dec. 31, 2009, its universe had grown to $221.8 billion, reflecting the rapid growth in the size of loans over those eight years. Over its seven years of performance tracking, the LL100 has had an average annualized total return of 5.4%.

=== 2008 financial crisis ===
The long history of these indexes helped to highlighted the impact of the 2008 financial crisis. Until 2008, the S&P LL indexes had very low volatility rates and their pricing remained close to par. Between 1996 and 2007, the lowest price hit by the LLI was 86.90 on Nov. 1, 2002, in the midst of the telecom default cycle. During the 2008 financial crisis, the price on the LLI had dropped as low as 60.33 – well into what has traditionally been known as distressed pricing.

The ELLI has a shorter history, but it still completely captures the supercharged rise of the European loan index in the years leading up to the credit crunch, as well as the subsequent fall to earth. Between 2002 and 2007, the average price on the ELLI never fell below 94.82 and even peaked over par at 100.91. With the onset of the credit crunch in 2008, pricing slid and had fallen as low as 59.05 and has not made it back to par.

The S&P/LSTA Loan 100 focuses on the more liquid side of the U.S. market. In the six years between its base date and the end of 2007, its pricing hit a trough of 89.05 and peaked over par at 101.32. Between 2008-2010, the price dropped to 59.20, but than rallied back significantly as sentiment regarding the credit markets improved.

=== Name change ===
In May 2022, Morningstar acquired S&Ps Leveraged Commentary & Data (LCD) unit which resulted in a name of all the indices from S&P to Morningstar.

== Components ==
The S&P/LSTA Loan Index and the S&P European Loan Index endeavor to replicate the invested institutional loan market. As a result, they attempt to track as many loans with institutional tranches in the market as possible. The S&P/LSTA Loan 100 is slightly different in that it is designed to reflect the performance of the largest, and thus more liquid, facilities in the U.S. loan market.

The loans tracked by the LLI and ELLI reflect the portfolios of the largest institutional investors in the U.S. and European loan markets. S&P LCD sources data from these investors to determine the components of all of its loan indexes and to update the current outstandings and spreads for the loans involved.

The market-value-return component of each index is based upon secondary market pricing received from leading mark-to-market pricing vendors. The LLI utilizes LSTA/Thomson Reuters Leveraged Loan Pricing data, and the ELLI uses Mark-It Partners. In both cases, the indexes only use prices based upon bid/ask quotes gathered from dealers in the loan market, and they exclude values from derived pricing models.

Facilities are eligible for inclusion in the indexes if they are senior secured institutional term loans with a minimum initial spread of 125 bps and a term of one year. They are retired from the indexes when there is no bid posted for the facility for at least 12 successive weeks, or when the loan is prepaid.

== Calculation ==
The S&P LL Indexes are market value weighted. The return for each index is the composite of each component facility’s return times the market value outstanding from the prior time period. In the ELLI, which consists of facilities denominated in euros, pound sterling and U.S. dollars, for the purpose of weighting, non-euro facilities are converted to euros at the current exchange rate.

The total return for each facility in the indexes is calculated in its native currency. The total return reflects market value change, interest accrued and any gain or loss resulting from the repayment of principal.
