= SOFR Academy =

- Type: Private
- Industry: Financial market infrastructure
- Founded: 2020
- Founder: Marcus Anthony Burnett
- Headquarters: New York City, United States
- Products: Across-the-Curve Credit Spread Index (AXI); Financial Conditions Credit Spread Index (FXI)
- Website: sofr.org

SOFR Academy, Inc. is an American financial market infrastructure company focused on developing benchmark credit-spread infrastructure designed to complement risk-free reference rates in global capital markets. In connection with global reference rate reform and the transition away from the London Interbank Offered Rate (LIBOR), which underpinned approximately US$400 trillion in financial contracts globally, the firm operationalized U.S.-dollar Across-the-Curve Credit Spread Indices (AXI) that can be referenced in financial products in conjunction with the Secured Overnight Financing Rate (SOFR) to address asset-liability funding mismatches observed under risk-free rate regimes.

== Funding ==
SOFR Academy has received backing from venture capital firm 8VC, led by Palantir Technologies founder Joe Lonsdale, and individual investors including Robert Litterman, who spent 23 years at Goldman Sachs and developed the Black–Litterman model together with Fischer Black in 1990.

== Foundation ==
Founded in 2020, SOFR Academy was established by Marcus A. Burnett, a former interest rate trader and capital markets consultant who began his career at the Commonwealth Bank. The firm initially focused on economic education in connection with reference rate reform, and in 2021, expanded their concentration through the development of benchmark credit spread reference rates that can be used with risk-free rates.

== Senior Advisors ==
SOFR Academy’s advisory panel includes academics and former senior market participants with experience in financial regulation, public policy, derivatives markets, and benchmark design.

Academic advisors have included Alex Edmans and economists affiliated with institutions such as Harvard University, the University of California, Berkeley, New York University, Tsinghua University, the Australian National University, the University of Oxford, and the London Business School. Haoxiang Zhu, of the Massachusetts Institute of Technology and later Director of the U.S. Securities and Exchange Commission’s Division of Trading and Markets, previously served as an advisor prior to his appointment at the SEC.

Senior market practitioners serving as advisors include Alex Roever, former Head of U.S. Interest Rate Strategy at JPMorgan & Co.; Alexander J. Matturri Jr., former Chief Executive Officer of S&P Dow Jones Indices; Thomas Pluta, former President of Tradeweb Markets and longtime JPMorgan executive; and R. Martin Chavez, Partner and Vice Chairman at Sixth Street Partners, a former Goldman Sachs executive and current a member of the Board of Directors of Alphabet Inc. (Google);

In 2025, former Commodity Futures Trading Commission Chairman Timothy Massad—a former partner at Cravath, Swaine & Moore—joined as Senior Advisor.

== Financial Benchmarks ==
=== AXI and FXI ===
In 2021, SOFR Academy announced its intention to develop and implement Across-the-Curve Credit Spread Indices to assist the market with U.S. Dollar LIBOR transition. In 2022, Invesco Indexing LLC, an independent index provider owned by global asset manager Invesco Ltd (NYSE: IVZ), partnered with SOFR Academy to launch the first-of-their-kind US-dollar Across-the-Curve Credit Spread Indices ("AXI") and US-dollar Financial Conditions Credit Spread Indices ("FXI"). Effective April 30, 2026, benchmark administration and publication of USD AXI and USD FXI transferred from Invesco Indexing LLC to STOXX Ltd., part of ISS STOXX, which is majority owned by Deutsche Börse Group. STOXX is responsible for the administration, calculation and publication of the indices. The U.S.-dollar-denominated AXI and FXI benchmark credit spreads are available through Bloomberg, Refinitiv / LSEG and Wind Information. Bloomberg ticker codes include AXIIUNS (USD AXI) and FXIXUNS (USD FXI). The benchmarks are designed to be used as credit-spread overlays to SOFR rather than as substitutes for SOFR.

These indices work in conjunction with the SOFR and address a concern communicated by a group of American banks. This concern was that under a SOFR-only environment in times of economic stress, the return on banks' SOFR-linked loans would decline, while banks' unhedged costs of funds would increase, thus creating a significant mismatch between bank assets (loans) and liabilities (borrowings). AXI and FXI were discussed at the Credit Sensitivity Group Workshops hosted by the Federal Reserve Bank of New York.

=== IOSCO Compliance ===
In 2024, SOFR Academy engaged Promontory Financial Group, a regulatory consultancy owned by IBM, to assess the design and transparency of its U.S.-dollar Across-the-Curve Credit Spread Index (AXI) and Financial Conditions Credit Spread Index (FXI) against relevant International Organization of Securities Commissions (IOSCO) Principles for Financial Benchmarks. The IBM Promontory independent review concluded that the relevant IOSCO Principles had been fully implemented.

Subsequent academic analysis has examined AXI’s transaction depth, volatility characteristics, and maturity-weighted construction in the context of IOSCO benchmark design considerations.

=== Market Adoption ===
On January 30, 2025, AXI and FXI were the subject of an industry discussion hosted by H. Rodgin Cohen of Sullivan & Cromwell LLP, attended by representatives of major global financial institutions and regulatory agencies in observer capacity. According to the published meeting minutes, participants discussed the application of AXI and FXI in cash and derivatives markets, hedge accounting considerations, and their role as credit-spread overlays to the Secured Overnight Financing Rate (SOFR). The minutes further indicate that certain large banks had begun ingesting and using AXI data within internal treasury functions to support centralized cost-of-funds calculations and funding risk assessment. In June 2026, the Financial Times reported that some banks had experimented with using AXI for internal calculations, while observing that broader adoption of credit-spread benchmarks would likely require greater official-sector acceptance.

=== Regulatory Engagement ===
On April 7, 2025, SOFR Academy convened a discussion regarding United States financial stability in stress scenarios and the role of IOSCO-aligned supplements to the Secured Overnight Financing Rate (SOFR). Representatives from the Board of Governors of the Federal Reserve System, the Federal Deposit Insurance Corporation, the Commodity Futures Trading Commission, and the Financial Stability Oversight Council attended in an observational capacity, alongside academic participants. According to the published readout, the discussion addressed funding risk dynamics during periods of market stress, the role of credit-sensitive overlays in commercial lending markets, and existing public regulatory guidance indicating that banks retain flexibility in the selection of reference rates provided such choices are appropriate for their funding models and customer needs. The readout noted that participation did not constitute regulatory endorsement of any benchmark, product, or service.

=== Motivation ===
The conceptual foundations of AXI and FXI draw on academic research by Darrell Duffie at the Stanford Graduate School of Business, and Antje Berndt and Yichao Zhu at the Australian National University. In 2014, Duffie chaired the Market Participants Group, charged by the Financial Stability Board with recommending reforms to Libor, Euribor, and other interest rate benchmarks.

The Bank for International Settlements (BIS) has noted that, despite the widespread adoption of “nearly risk-free” rates (RFRs) following the transition away from LIBOR, there remains ongoing market demand for credit-sensitive term reference rates. The BIS attributes this persistence to the ability of credit-sensitive benchmarks to better capture bank credit and term-liquidity risks, and to provide borrowers and lenders greater payment certainty because the applicable rate is typically known at the start of the interest period (a feature valued in instruments such as loans and bonds with fixed payment schedules). By contrast, many RFR conventions are backward-looking and based on overnight transactions, making interest coupons known only at the end of the accrual period and less directly linked to bank funding conditions.

In June 2025, Viktor Tsyrennikov published A Case for AXI, an empirical study evaluating the design, behavior, and loan-pricing implications of the Across-the-Curve Credit Spread Index (AXI). The paper analyzes AXI’s transaction-based construction across short- and long-term wholesale bank funding markets and compares the performance of SOFR+AXI to SOFR-only and LIBOR-based loan pricing during stress episodes, including the onset of the COVID-19 pandemic and the Silicon Valley Bank collapse. The study finds that AXI is strongly correlated with established credit-spread measures and financial stress indicators, and that incorporating AXI into loan pricing can reduce funding risk while supporting lower contractual spreads without reducing risk-adjusted returns.

Industry commentary from the Global Association of Risk Professionals noted that while SOFR has replaced LIBOR as the preferred U.S. dollar reference rate, it does not incorporate a bank credit-risk component, leading market participants to explore complementary benchmarks that reflect funding conditions more directly.

== Policy Context ==
In 2025, The Journal of Finance published a study by Harry Cooperman, Darrell Duffie, Stephan Luck, Zachry Wang, and Yilin (David) Yang examining the effects of reference rate choice on bank credit supply.. The paper uses supervisory bank data to assess how transitioning from a credit-sensitive benchmark such as LIBOR to a near risk-free rate such as SOFR influences bank lending behavior. It finds that under credit-sensitive benchmarks, borrower interest payments rise when bank funding costs increase, which dampens incentives to draw heavily on credit lines during periods of stress. By contrast, risk-free rates such as SOFR tend to fall in stressed conditions, which can increase expected drawdowns and raise the cost to banks of providing revolving credit, leading in the model’s calibration to reduced credit commitments and drawn credit. The authors also find that, because banks price expected funding risk into contractual spreads, the overall average expected cost of drawn credit can be lower under a credit-sensitive reference rate. They conclude that credit-sensitive benchmarks can mitigate the transmission of funding shocks to bank balance sheets and contribute to more stable credit supply under certain funding conditions.

In May 2026, Alex Roever, a senior advisor to SOFR Academy, published commentary through the Bretton Woods Committee arguing that transparent, transaction-based credit-spread supplements used alongside SOFR could help align loan pricing with bank funding conditions during periods of stress and support more resilient credit provision.

== International Expansion ==
SOFR Academy has commissioned and published feasibility studies for the development of Across-the-Curve Credit Spread (AXI) and Financial Conditions Credit Spread (FXI) benchmarks in multiple jurisdictions. These initiatives are intended to complement local risk-free reference rates adopted following global benchmark reform and the transition away from LIBOR.

In addition to developing U.S. dollar AXI and FXI benchmarks, feasibility work has been undertaken in collaboration with academic institutions and market participants in Europe, China, Japan, and Latin America. Published studies include the proposed European AXI (“EURAXI”), the Chinese AXI, the Japanese FXI, and the Mexican AXI and FXI feasibility study. Additional feasibility studies have been reported as in progress for Brazil, India, and South Korea.

The following table summarizes regional and currency-specific Across-the-Curve Credit Spread (AXI) and Financial Conditions Credit Spread (FXI) indices feasibility work or guidance:

Region / Currency	Index Name	Description	Notes / Status
United States	USD AXI / USD FXI	U.S. dollar credit spread benchmarks designed to work with SOFR.	Published; available through major market data vendors globally.
China	CNAXI / CNFXI	Credit spread index intended to serve as a reference for Chinese commercial bank credit pricing and risk management, complementing local reference rates.	Published; available through major market data vendors globally.
Europe / Eurozone	European AXI ("EURAXI")	Proposed euro-denominated credit spread index intended to work with the euro short-term rate (€STR), developed with academic support including researchers at the University of Oxford.	Feasibility study published.
Japan	Japanese FXI (and feasibility for JPAXI/JPFXI)	Financial conditions credit spread index in Japanese yen to complement TONA/TORF post-benchmark reform.	Feasibility study published.
Mexico	Mexican AXI / Mexican FXI	Credit spread indices tailored to Mexican markets alongside Overnight TIIE, aimed at enhancing pricing and risk benchmarks.	Feasibility study reported as in progress
Brazil	Brazilian AXI / FXI feasibility	Indices under study for Brazilian credit markets.	Feasibility study reported as in progress
India	Indian AXI / FXI feasibility	Similar feasibility work underway for Indian markets.	Feasibility study reported as in progress
South Korea	Korean AXI / FXI feasibility	Feasibility studies underway for South Korean markets.	Feasibility study reported as in progress

== Professional Affiliations ==
SOFR Academy reports membership of several industry and academic organizations, including the International Swaps and Derivatives Association (ISDA), the Loan Syndications and Trading Association (LSTA), the Bankers Association for Finance and Trade (BAFT), and the Bretton Woods Committee (BWC). The firm also maintains membership in the American Economic Association (AEA) and the United States Chamber of Commerce (USCC).
