= Flex language =

Flex language or market flex language is flexibility inserted into a syndicated loan contract that allows the arranging bank to alter the terms of the borrowing in order to attract enough lenders to finance the loan. These alterations could include increases in the interest rate, changes in covenants, or increases in prepayment penalties. Market flex language was adopted by arrangers following the 1998 Russian financial crisis.
