= Term loan =

Monetary loan repaid in regular payments

A term loan is a monetary loan that is repaid in regular payments over a set period of time. Term loans usually last between one and ten years, but may last as long as 30 years. A term loan involves paying interest with the interest amount being added to the amount that needs to be repaid. The interest rate which could fixed or floating is often based on the borrower's credit rating and when floating is often based on a benchmark rate such as EURIBOR, SOFR or a similar benchmark rate.

Term loans are normally business loans and are in contrast to a line of credit or short term demand loans. The ability to repay over a long period of time can be attractive for new or expanding enterprises, as the assumption is that they will increase their profit over time thus being able to repay the loan. Term loans are a way for a business to quickly increase capital in order to raise a business’ supply capabilities or range. For instance, a new companies may use a term loan to buy a company vehicles or rent more space for their operations. Term loans may be raised in issuance to a borrower in the form of bank-syndicated debt, or the institution market. Institutional Term Loans, or rather those that trade on secondary exchanges are commonly referred to as "Term Loan B". These facilities are typically 7 years and lack financial covenants. In US law-governed loan transactions, they are considered senior debt and usually not subordinated to other indebtedness.

== Considerations ==
The cost of the loan is the interest rate which can be fixed or floating. A fixed interest rate means that the percentage of interest will never increase, regardless of the financial market. Floating interest rates will fluctuate with the market, which can be good or bad depending on what happens with the global and national economy. Since some term loans last for 10 years or more the interest rate is an important risk consideration for both borrower and lender.

Most term loans will use compound interest. If it does, the amount of interest will be periodically added to the principal borrowed amount, meaning that the interest keeps getting bigger the longer the term lasts. Although the term is fixed, the borrower may be able to repay it early in full, but there may be penalties for early repayment of the loan.

Some lending institutions offer a variety of repayment plans for a term loan. Commonly, the loan is structured to pay off the debt in even amounts. However it may be structured so that payment gradually increase over the loan period or step up over time. This may be advantageous, if the borrower considers that it will be in better position to repay the loan in the future, but this would increase the interest amount and increases the risk for the lender. Even payments tend to help prevent a default on the loan.

== See also ==
- Business loan
- Corporate bond
- Debt ratio
- Line of credit
- Mortgage
