= Note issuance facility =

Underwriting agreement in the Euro-currency market

Note issuance facility (NIF) is an underwriting agreement/arrangement in the Eurocurrency market under which borrowers place short/medium term (one to six months) notes via a syndicate of prime/commercial banks, and the borrowers' issue is backed by the commitment of the syndicate banks to purchase any paper which the borrowers may be unable to sell. Since the facility/guarantee itself is contingent, the creation of NIF does not give rise to an entry in the financial account and will be treated as an off-balance sheet item in the guarantor books. When the underwriting institution is requested to make funds available, it will acquire the actual asset (notes) and will be recorded in the financial account.
