= Anatoly Gunst =

Russian architect (1858–1919)

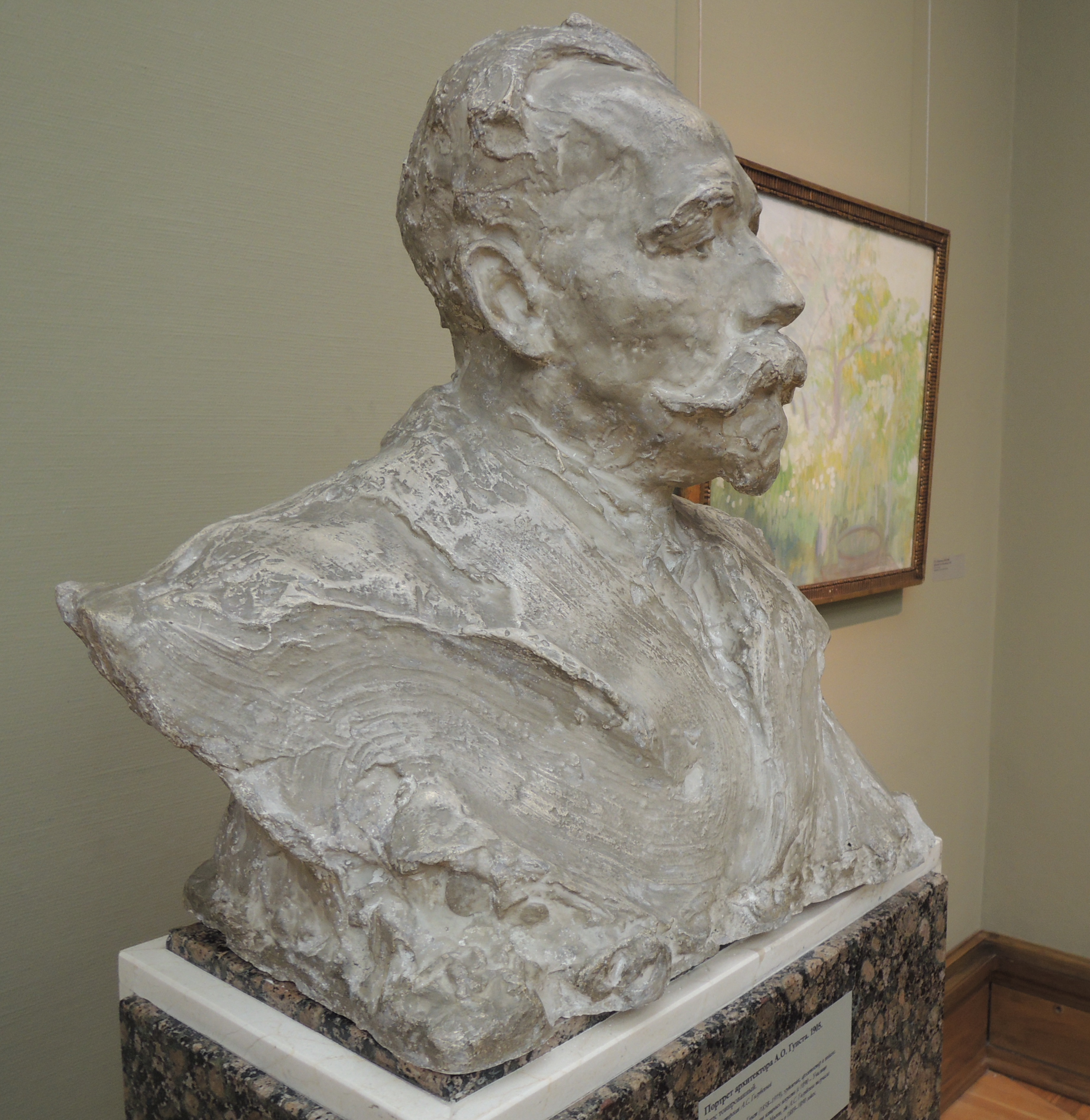
Portrait bust of Anatoly Gunst; by Anna Golubkina (1905)

Anatoly Ottovich Gunst (Russian: Анатолий Оттович Гунст; 19 November 1858, Moscow – 27 November 1919, Moscow) was a Russian architect, artist, teacher and actor.

== Biography ==
He was born to a family of Russified Germans from Kazan. His father, Otto Gunst, and cousin Alexander Gunst (1862—1938), were also architects. His youngest brother, Yevgeny, was a composer and pianist. In 1878, he entered the Moscow School of Painting, Sculpture and Architecture, from which he graduated in 1882. During his studies, he was a construction assistant for the Cathedral of Christ the Saviour, as well as several smaller projects, and taught drawing at the Komissarov Technical School. From 1882 to 1884, he was a teacher at Moscow State School 57. He later took study trips to Austria, Germany and Italy.

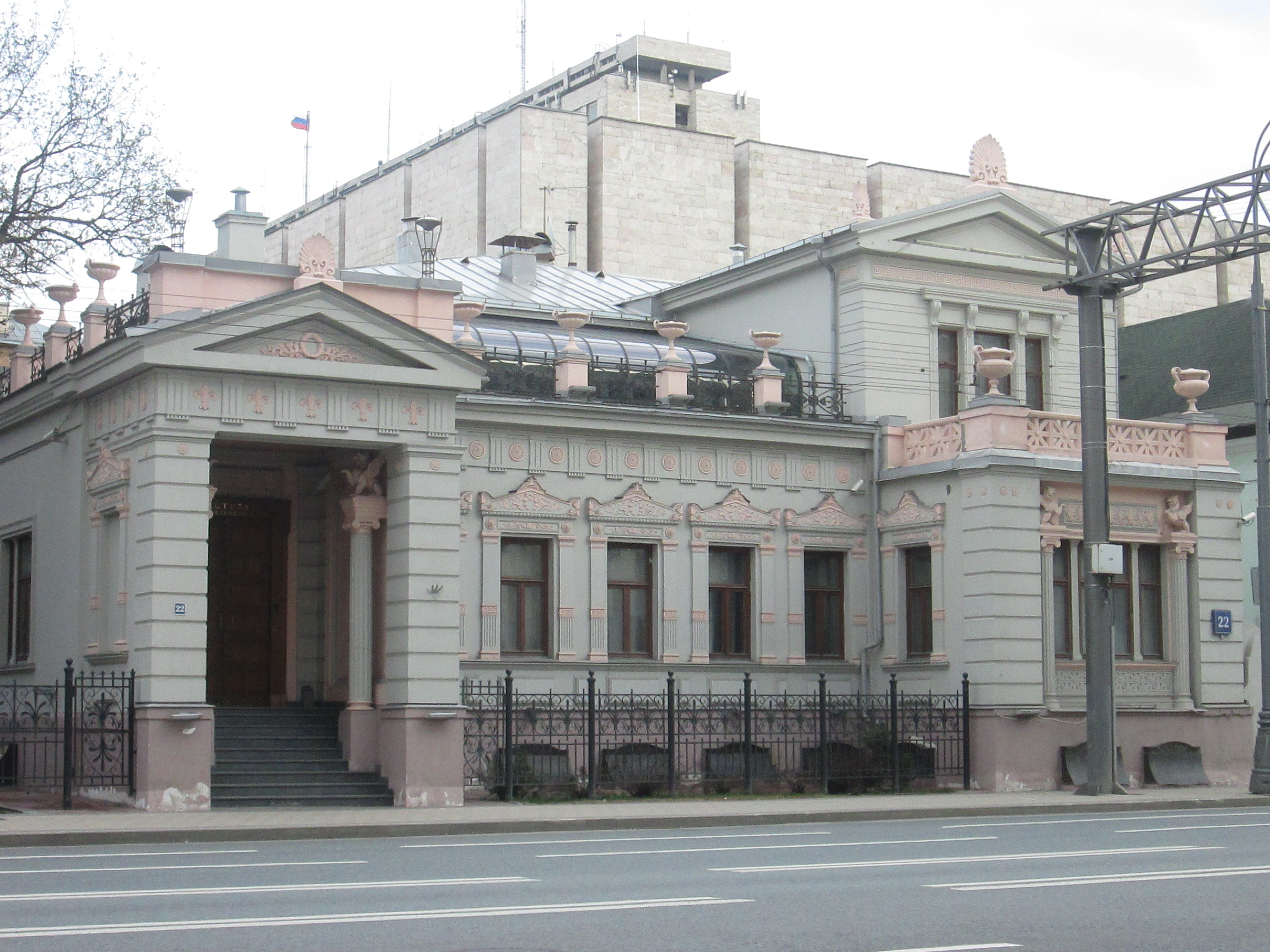
Residence at 22 Mira Avenue

In 1886, with support from the Rumyantsev Museum, he founded the Gunst School of Fine Arts; the first private art school in Russia. It offered six-year courses for both men and women. Especially talented students were allowed to attend for free. Exhibitions were held where they could sell their work. He applied for government certification, to give his students the same status as those in public institutions, but both major schools in Moscow, his alma mater and the Stroganov Moscow State Academy of Arts and Industry, were against the proposal. It closed, for financial reasons, in 1891.

In 1894, he became a member of the Moscow Architectural Society. Two years later, he was appointed a district architect. In 1904, he received the post of supernumerary technician of the Construction Department of the Moscow Governorate. From 1905 to 1906, he served on the municipal Construction Council.

He was also an amateur actor; participating in the Drama Salon Society, whose members included Maria Yermolova and Alexander Yuzhin. In his later years, he was a member of the "League of Performing Arts Lovers". Together with Yevgeny Vakhtangov, he helped create the Studio of Dramatic Art which, in 1921, became the Vakhtangov Theatre. In 1917, he acted at the Maly Theatre.

He was married to Matilda Caesarevna Rober-Niku, a native of Switzerland. Their son, Yevgeny, was a well-known translator and literary critic.

== Sources ==
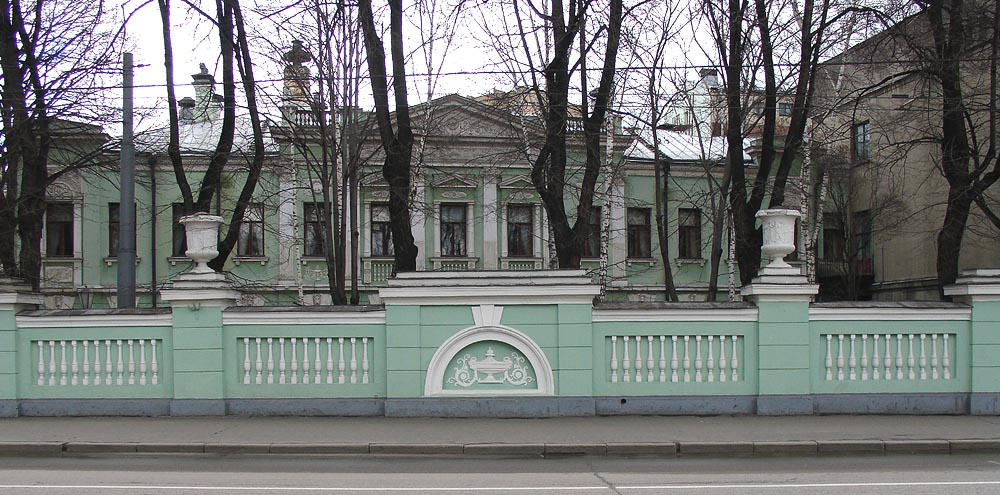
The Central House of Scientists

- Maria Nashchokina; Архитекторы московского модерна. Творческие портреты (Moscow Art Nouveau architects. Creative portraits), 3rd ed. Жираф, 2005 pp.161—164 ISBN 5-89832-043-1
- Зодчие Москвы времени эклектики, модерна и неоклассицизма (The architects of Moscow of the time of eclecticism, modernity and neoclassicism), Museum of Architecture, А. V. Shchuseva et al. (Eds.), 1998 pgs. 86-87 ISBN 5-900395-17-0
- Московская энциклопедия (Moscow encyclopedia), S. O. Schmidt (Ed.), Издательский центр «Москвоведение», 2007 pg.465 ISBN 978-5-903633-01-2
