= ISDAfix =

International Swaps and Derivatives Association
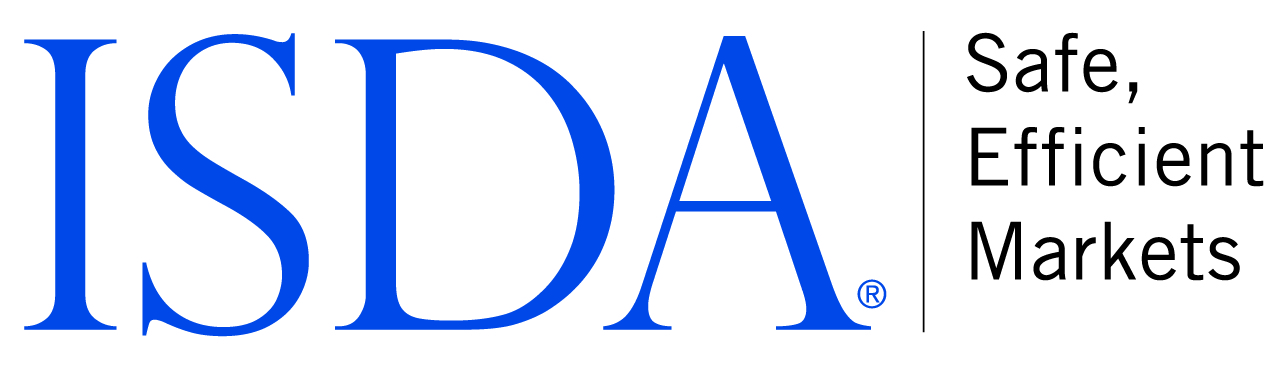
- Company type: Trade association
- Founded: 1985
- Headquarters: New York City
- Website: www.isda.org

ISDAFIX refers to a worldwide common reference rate value for fixed interest rate swap rates. ISDAFIX was restructured and renamed "ICE Swap Rate" in April 2015.

ISDAFIX was developed in 1998 as a cooperative effort of the International Swaps and Derivatives Association (ISDA) with Reuters (now Thomson Reuters) and InterCapital Brokers (now ICAP). It was based on voluntary quotations provided by certain banks that indicated the fixed rate they would pay or receive to enter into a reference swap with a nominal value of 50 million dollars. ISDAFIX fixes as of February 2014 were determined for four currencies (Euros, British pounds, Swiss francs, and U.S. dollars), each in different maturities; the rates for the Hong Kong dollar and the Japanese yen were suspended in April 2013 and January 2014, respectively, because the withdrawal of individual banks reduced the number of available quotations. Thomson Reuters collected quotation messages daily from the reference banks and performed the final calculation of the reference sets for each currency.

The main purpose of the collection of ISDAFIX fixes was to determine an exercise price for the cash settlement of swaptions (that is, options to enter into fixed rate swaps). ISDAFIX sets were also often used to determine close-out payments if interest rate swaps were terminated early. Swap dealers also used ISDAFIX to determine the market value of swap products.

== Restructuring ==
As part of the Libor scandals from 2012 the ISDAFIX fixes came in for criticism. The American Commodity Futures Trading Commission and the UK Financial Conduct Authority investigated manipulation allegations. ICAP, which in the wake of the Libor scandal paid penalties in the amount of $87 million to British and American authorities, during the ongoing investigations in early 2014 lost its role in the data collection for and calculation of the ISDAFIX rates for the U.S. dollar.

ISDA also announced changes to ISDAFIX. The US dollar sets and others were switched to a market-based, automated calculation process; it was also agreed to further reduce the portfolio of offered reference rates when the associated swap market is insufficiently liquid.
