= Stockholm Interbank Offered Rate =

Reference rate in Sweden

Stockholm Interbank Offered Rate (STIBOR) is a daily reference rate based on the interest rates at which banks offer to lend unsecured funds to other banks in the Swedish wholesale money market (or interbank market). STIBOR is the average (with the exception of the highest and lowest quotes) of the interest rates listed at 11 a.m.

== See also ==
- Euribor
- Leverage (finance)
- Margin (finance)
