= Participation loan =

Participation loans are loans made by multiple lenders to a single borrower. It is similar to syndicated loan but each lender passes the funds to the lead financial institution which provides the loan to the lender.

Several banks, for example, might chip in to fund one extremely large loan, with one of the banks taking the role of the "lead bank". This lending institution then recruits other banks to participate and share the risks and profits. The lead bank typically originates the loan, takes responsibility for the loan servicing of the participation loan, organizes and manages the participation, and deals directly with the borrower. Credit unions can also participate loans in the same manner.

== Structure ==
Participations in the loan are sold by the lead financial institution ("FI") to other FI's. A separate contract called a loan participation agreement is structured and agreed among the FI's. Loan participations can either be made on a pari passu basis with equal risk sharing for all loan participants, or on a senior/subordinated basis, where the senior lender is paid first and the subordinate loan participation paid only if there are sufficient funds left over to make the payments. Such senior/subordinated loan participations can be structured either on a LIFO (Last In First Out) or FIFO (First In First Out) basis (see FIFO and LIFO accounting).

== Usage ==
The most compelling reasons that financial institutions use participation loans are as follows:

- Selling loan participations allows the lead bank to originate an exceptionally large loan that would otherwise be too large for it to handle by itself. By engaging other banks as participants, the lead bank can remain within its own legal lending limits and still come up with sufficient cash for funding.
- Banks that buy loan participations share in the profits of the lead bank. If a lending institution isn't doing much business on its own, or is in a slow market, it can team up with a profitable "lead bank" in a healthier market to generate more lending income.
- Buying participation loans is a way for banks to diversify their assets. By investing a variety of loans in different locales, they reduce their risk and exposure to potential losses if a calamity, such as a natural disaster or severe economic depression, were to strike their particular community.
- Selling loan participations allows a bank to reduce its credit risk to a customer or specific community that entails greater than average risk.
- Selling participation loans allows the lead bank to keep control of more of an important customer relationship or even an entire customer relationship of large customers of the bank, instead of sharing the relationship with other competing banks.

== See also ==
- Syndicated loan
- Peer-to-peer lending
- Financing
