= Cleanup clause =

A cleanup clause is a contractual provision in a loan agreement which provides that all loans must be repaid within a specified period, after which no further loans will be made available to the debtor for a specified "cleanup" period.

It may also refer to revolving line of credit. A lender may require a cleanup period annually, for example a borrower may have to pay down the balance to zero for 30 days.

== Banking practice ==
Cleanup clauses are most commonly associated with short-term working capital facilities and revolving lines of credit. Banking guidance describes a clean-up period as a specified period, often around 30 days, during which the borrower is required to pay off the loan balance. This requirement is intended to demonstrate that the borrower is not relying on the credit facility as a source of permanent financing.

U.S. banking supervisory materials also note the importance of assessing whether a borrower’s trade cycle supports a complete payout of seasonal lines of credit. In this context, a cleanup requirement helps lenders distinguish between genuinely seasonal borrowing needs and ongoing working capital dependence.
