= Book building =

Generating, capturing, and recording investor demand for shares

Book building is a systematic process of generating, capturing, and recording investor demand for shares. Usually, the issuer appoints a major investment bank to act as a major securities underwriter or bookrunner.

Book building is an alternative method of making a public issue in which applications are accepted from huge buyers such as financial institutions, corporations or high net-worth individuals, almost on firm allotment basis, instead of asking them to apply in public offer. Book building is a relatively new option for issues of securities, the first guidelines of which were issued on October 12, 1995, and have been revised from time to time since. Book building is a method of issuing shares based on a floor price which is indicated before the opening of the bidding process.

== Overview ==
The "book" is the off-market collation of investor demand by the bookrunner and is confidential to the bookrunner, issuer, and underwriter. Where shares are acquired, or transferred via a bookbuild, the transfer occurs off-market, and the transfer is not guaranteed by an exchange's clearing house. Where an underwriter has been appointed, the underwriter bears the risk of non-payment by an acquirer or non-delivery by the seller.

Book building is a common practice in developed countries and has made inroads into emerging markets as well. Bids may be submitted online, but the book is maintained off-market by the bookrunner and bids are confidential to the bookrunner. Unlike a public issue, the book building route will see a minimum number of applications and large order size per application. The price at which new shares are issued is determined after the book is closed at the discretion of the bookrunner in consultation with the issuer. Generally, bidding is by invitation only to high-net-worth clients of the bookrunner and, if any, lead manager, or co-manager. Generally, securities laws require additional disclosure requirements to be met if the issue is to be offered to all investors. Consequently, participation in a book build may be limited to certain classes of investors. If retail clients are invited to bid, retail bidders are generally required to bid at the final price, which is unknown at the time of the bid, due to the impracticability of collecting multiple price point bids from each retail client. Although bidding is by invitation, the issuer and bookrunner retain discretion to give some bidders a greater allocation of their bids than other investors. Typically, large institutional bidders receive preference over smaller retail bidders, by receiving a greater allocation as a proportion of their initial bid. All bookbuilding is conducted "off-market" and most stock exchanges have rules that require that on-market trading be halted during the bookbuilding process.

The key differences between acquiring shares via a bookbuild (conducted off-market) and trading (conducted on-market) are:

1. bids into the book are confidential vs. transparent bid and ask prices on a stock exchange;
2. bidding is by invitation only (only high-net-worth clients of the bookrunner and any co-managers may bid);
3. the bookrunner and the issuer determine the price of the shares to be issued and the allocations of shares between bidders in their absolute discretion;
4. all shares are issued or transferred at the same price whereas on-market acquisitions provide for multiple trading prices.

The bookrunner collects bids from investors at various prices, between the floor price and the cap price. Bids can be revised by the bidder before the book closes. The process aims at tapping both wholesale and retail investors. The final issue price is not determined until the end of the process when the book has closed. After the close of the book building period, the bookrunner evaluates the collected bids on the basis of certain evaluation criteria and sets the final issue price.

If demand is high enough, the book can be oversubscribed. In these cases the greenshoe option is triggered.

Book building is essentially a process used by companies raising capital through public offerings, both initial public offers (IPOs) or follow-on public offers (FPOs), to aid price and demand discovery. It is a mechanism where, during the period for which the book for the offer is open, the bids are collected from investors at various prices, which are within the price band specified by the issuer. The process is directed towards both the institutional as well as the retail investors. The issue price is determined after the bid closure based on the demand generated in the process.

== Process ==
When a company wants to raise money, it plans on offering its stock to the public. This typically takes place through either an IPO or FPO. The book building process helps determine the value of the security. Once a company determines it wants to have an IPO, it will then contact a bookrunner or a lead manager. The bookrunner will determine the price range at which it is willing to sell the stock. The bookrunner will then send out the draft prospectus to potential investors. Generally, the issue stays open for five days. At the end of the five days, the bookrunner determines the demand of the stock for its given price range. Once the cost of the stock has been determined, then the issuing company can decide how to divide its stock at the determined price to its bidders. A criticism of the current process is that it is very manual and communication is done via email, telephone calls and chat rooms. There is strong interest from the investor side to automate this process and reduce operational risk by using an online platform.

== Real-life application ==
Before Facebook's IPO, the book building process was used to determine how much the stock was worth before it was sold to the public. Morgan Stanley was the lead manager for Facebook's IPO. Initially, the stock was thought to be determined between $28 and $35 a share. The week before the stock was sold, the demand for the stock was sufficient to increase the price between $34 and $38 a share. Once the stock was offered, Morgan Stanley tried to prevent the stock from falling below $38 a share in order to prevent the IPO from being considered a failure. Since Facebook stock initially had a high demand, but this demand fell and its price consequently fell, it was considered that Facebook was overvalued when it was sold at its initial public offering.
