= U.S. Dollar ICE Bank Yield Index =

The U.S. Dollar ICE Bank Yield Index is an index proposed by Intercontinental Exchange Benchmark Administration (IBA) in January 2019 to measure the yields at which investors are willing to lend U.S. dollar funds to large, internationally active banks on a wholesale, unsecured basis over one-month, three-month and six-month periods. Its usage is intended to be similar to how Libor is currently used.

Due to issues with interference with Libor and recommendations to phase it out, the USD ICE BYI has been designed to be fully transaction based, avoiding issues with manipulation. The methodology has been in testing for the past year and IBA is inviting market participants to review and provide feedback during the first quarter of 2019.
