= Lead arranger =

Bank coordinating a syndicated loan

The lead arranger, or the mandated lead arranger (MLA), is the investment bank or underwriter firm that facilitates and leads a group of investors in a syndicated loan for major financing. The lead arranger assigns parts of the new issue to other underwriters for placement, and usually takes the largest part itself. It is also called a managing underwriter or a syndicate manager. The arranger is paid either through an arranger fee, through skimming or through structuring fees.

In Europe the term most used is the mandated lead arranger, they generally have the leading role in the financing stage of a project. The arranger often underwrites the financing, then handles syndication or builds up a group to underwrite the full amount and syndicate. As a requirement of its mandate from the project sponsor, the MLA will be committed to raise the complete debt financing, which for a major project could be many hundreds of millions of dollars. But, commercial lenders typically do not want to take more than a small part of the debt for a particular project and will want to pass some of the debt, and hence some of the risk, to other lenders. The process of selling the debt is called syndication.

In large deals with multiple tranches, there may be an arranger for all, or there may be a separate arranger for each tranche. During the syndication process, one of the banks may fulfil the role of book runner. The role of the book runner is simply to keep a record of how much debt each of the potential syndication banks wants to take.

== Role in loan syndication ==
In a syndicated loan, the borrower commonly appoints one or more arrangers to assemble the lending syndicate. The arranger coordinates the group of banks or other lenders willing to provide credit on the agreed loan terms, and may retain part of the loan while distributing other portions to participating lenders. Lead arrangers may also negotiate the loan terms, recruit participant lenders through a book-building process, and perform monitoring functions during the life of the loan.

== See also ==
- Project finance
