= Range accrual =

In finance, a range accrual is a type of derivative product very popular among structured note investors. It is estimated that more than US$160 billion of Range Accrual indexed on interest rates only have been sold to investors between 2004 and 2007. It is one of the most popular non-vanilla financial derivatives. In essence the investor in a range accrual is "betting" that the reference "index" - usually interest rates or currency exchange rates - will stay within a predefined range.

== Payoff description ==
A general expression for the payoff of a range accrual is:

$$P \times \sum_{i=1}^{N} 1_{\text{index}(i) \in \text{Range}} \times \frac{1}{N}$$

- index(i) is the value of the index at the ith observation date
- N is the total number of observations within a period
- P is the payout when the index is in the range

If the observation frequency is daily, the payoff could be more easily written as

$$P \times \frac{n}{N}$$

where

- n is the number of days a specified index is within a given range
- N is the total number of days of the observation period
- P is the payout for any given day where the index is in the range

The index could be an interest rate (e.g. USD 3 months Libor), or a FX rate (e.g. EUR/USD) or a commodity (e.g. oil price) or any other observable financial index.
The observation period can be different from daily (e.g. weekly, monthly, etc.), though a daily observation is the most encountered.

The receiver of the range accrual coupons is selling binary options. The value of these options is used to enhance the coupon paid.

=== Example ===
Let's take an example of a 5 years range accrual note linked to USD 3 months Libor, with range set as [1.00%; 6.00%] and a conditional coupon of 5.00%. Let's assume the note to start on January 1, 2009 and the first coupon payment to happen on July 1, 2009.

An investor who buys USD 100m of this note will have the following cash flows:

- First coupon — Between January 1 and July 1, 2009, if USD 3m Libor fixes between

1.00% and 6.00% for 130 days, then the rate applied for the first semester will be:

5.00% × 130/181 = 3.5912% (there are 181 days in total between January 1, 2009 and July 1, 2009).
The coupon paid on July 1, 2009 would be: US$100m × 3.5912% × 0.5 = $1,795,600 (assuming 0.5 for the day-count fraction between January 1, 2009 and July 1, 2009)

- Second coupon - Between July 1, 2009 and January 1, 2010, if USD 3m Libor fixes between 1.00% and 6.00% for 155 days, then the rate applied for the second semester will be:

5.00% × 155/184= 4.2120%.
The coupon paid on January 1, 2010 would be: US$100m × 4.2120% × 0.5 = $2,106,000 (assuming 0.5 for the day-count fraction between July 1, 2009 and January 1, 2010).

- For the 8 following coupons, the same methodology applies. The highest rate investor will get is 5.00% and the lowest 0.00%.

=== Different types of range accruals ===
The payout (P in our notation), for each day the index is in the range, could be either a fix or variable rate.

== Valuation and risks ==
A range accrual can be seen as a strip of binary options, with a decreasing lag between fixing date and payment date. For this reason, it is important the valuation model is well calibrated to the volatility term structure of the underlying, at least at the strikes implied by the range.

If furthermore the range accrual is callable, then the valuation model also needs to take into account the dynamic between the swaption and the underlying.

Accrual swaps that monitor permanence of interest rates into a range and pay a related interest rate times the permanence factor also depend on correlation across different adjacent forward rates. For the details see for example Brigo and Mercurio (2001).
