= Gross-up clause =

Contract provision shielding payments from deductions

A gross-up clause is a contract provision which provides that all payments must be made in the full amount, free of any deductions without exercising any right of set-off. The provision will usually indicate that if there is a mandatory withholding or deduction required by law (usually with respect to tax), then the paying party shall "gross up" the payment so that the receiving party receives the same net amount. The purpose of a gross up is so that the payer, instead of the payee, assumes the risk of any change in tax imposed. Gross-up clauses are found in international loan agreements, as well as executive compensation agreements (more often in mid-sized and large companies).

The formula for calculating the total amount of a grossed-up payment is (the amount of the payment) divided by (1 minus the tax rate). Thus, a $10,000 payment to a recipient who has a 35% tax rate would be ($10,000) / (1–35%) = (10,000/.65) = $15,384.62.

== Sample clause ==
"All payments to be made under this Agreement shall be made in cleared funds, without any deduction or set-off and free and clear of and without deduction for or on account of any taxes, levies, imports, duties, charges, fees and withholdings of any nature now or hereafter imposed by any governmental, fiscal or other authority save as required by law. If a Party to this Agreement is compelled to make any such deduction, it will pay to the receiving Party such additional amounts as are necessary to ensure receipt by the receiving Party of the full amount which that party would have received but for the deduction."

== Withholding tax in loan agreements ==
Gross-up clauses are especially important in cross-border loan agreements, where interest payments may be subject to withholding tax under local law. HM Revenue and Customs notes that it is common for a loan agreement to contain a withholding tax grossing-up clause under which, if the borrower is required to withhold income tax from an interest payment, the borrower must nevertheless pay an amount that leaves the lender with the full gross interest.
