= Reference rate =

Benchmark interest rate used to price loans and financial contracts

A reference rate is a rate that determines pay-offs in a financial contract and that is outside the control of the parties to the contract. It is often some form of LIBOR rate, but it can take many forms, such as a consumer price index, a house price index or an unemployment rate. Parties to the contract choose a reference rate that neither party has power to manipulate.

== Examples of use ==
The most common use of reference rates is that of short-term interest rates such as LIBOR in floating rate notes, loans, swaps, short-term interest rate futures contracts, etc. The rates are calculated by an independent organisation, such as the British Bankers Association (BBA) as the average of the rates quoted by a large panel of banks, to ensure independence.

Another example is that of swap reference rates for constant maturity swaps. The ISDAfix rates used are calculated daily for an independent organisation, the International Swaps and Derivatives Association, from quotes from a large panel of banks.

In the credit derivative market a similar concept to reference rates is used. Pay offs are not determined by a rate, but by possible events. In this case, the reference event has to be a very precisely defined credit event, to make sure there can be no disagreement on whether the event has occurred or not..

Typically the benchmark LIBOR is the three-month rate.

== Reference rates for short-term interest rates ==
Examples of reference rates for short-term interest rates are:

- LIBOR - London Interbank Offered Rate. LIBOR was terminated in June 2023.
- SOFR - Secured Overnight Financing Rate. SOFR is a reference rate established as an alternative to LIBOR.
- Euribor - Euro Interbank Offered Rate
- €STR - Euro short-term rate
- TIBOR - Tokyo Interbank Offered Rate. Euroyen TIBOR will be terminated in 2024.
- TONAR - Tokyo Overnight Average Rate
- SIBOR - Singapore Interbank Offered Rate
- STIBOR - Stockholm Interbank Offered Rate
- WIBOR - Warsaw Interbank Offered Rate
- MIBOR - Mumbai Interbank Offered Rate
- PRIBOR - Prague Interbank Offered Rate
- BUBOR - Budapest Interbank Offered Rate
- HIBOR - Hong Kong Interbank Offered Rate
- SHIBOR - Shanghai Interbank Offered Rate
- ISDAfix - International Swap Dealers Association Fix
- TELBOR - Tel Aviv Interbank Offered Rate
