= Shared National Credit Program =

The Shared National Credit Program is a review of large syndicated bank loans in the United States conducted by the Board of Governors of the Federal Reserve, the Federal Deposit Insurance Corporation, and the Office of the Comptroller of the Currency. The review covers all loans of $100 million or greater that are shared by three or more institutions. The review is annually beginning in 1977, and typically starts in March with results published around the beginning of the third quarter.
