= Fixed interest rate loan =

A fixed interest rate loan is a loan where the interest rate doesn't fluctuate during the fixed rate period of the loan. During this fixed-rate period, the borrower’s interest payments do not change, allowing future repayments to be predicted with a high degree of certainty. Variable rate loans, by contrast, are anchored to the prevailing discount rate. A fixed interest rate is a specific, fixed interest tied to a loan or a line of credit that must be repaid, along with the principal.

A fixed rate is the most common form of interest for consumers, as they are easy to calculate, easy to understand, and stable – both the borrower and the lender know exactly what interest rate obligations are tied to a loan or credit account.

== Mechanism and repayment ==
Under a fixed interest rate arrangement, the interest charged on the loan principal remains unchanged for the duration of the fixed period. For example, consider a loan of $10,000 from a bank to a borrower. Given a fixed interest rate of 5%, the actual cost of the loan, with principal and interest combined, is $10,500. This is the amount that must be paid back by the borrower.

A fixed interest rate is based on the lender's assumptions about the average discount rate over the fixed rate period. For example, when the discount rate is historically low, fixed rates are normally higher than variable rates because interest rates are more likely to rise during the fixed rate period. Conversely, when interest rates are historically high, lenders normally offer a discount to borrowers to fix their interest rate over time, as rates are more likely to fall during the fixed rate period.

=== Capital value and interest rate risk ===
The capital value of a fixed rate loan is generally determined as a function of future interest rates at the time of calculation. This means that they contain a capital risk, in that if interest rates fall, the capital value of the loan rises, and vice versa. This differs from a variable rate loan, where the capital value is always the original loan less any capital repayments.

This can lead to counter-intuitive results. For example, a 15-year fixed rate loan of £100,000 taken out at the middle of 2011 would have had a capital value of around £115,000 at the middle of 2013. Although UK Base Rate remained level at 0.5%, the forward curve, used to price such instruments, fell (i.e., became less convex upwards).

For domestic mortgages, the lender often provides guarantees such that the break cost of a loan (in excess of the reported capital outstanding) is limited, often to a number of months repayments. These guarantees, usually only applicable where the fixed term is relatively short, are effectively a derivative instrument whose one-way benefit is granted to the borrower.

Some fixed interest loans – particularly mortgages intended for the use of people with previous adverse credit – have an 'extended overhang', that is to say that once the initial fixed rate period is over, the person taking out the loan is tied into it for a further extended period at a higher interest rate before they are able to redeem it.

In the UK, Nationwide Commercial recently issued a 30-year fixed rate mortgage as bridging finance.
