= Loan Syndications and Trading Association =

- Abbreviation: LSTA
- Formation: 26 December 1995; 30 years ago
- Legal status: Domestic not-for-profit corporation organised under the laws of New York
- Purpose: Debt finance
- Location(s): 366 Madison Avenue, Manhattan, New York City
- Region served: United States, The Americas
- Chief Executive Officer & Executive Director: Sean P. Griffin
- Main organ: LSTA Board of Directors
- Website: www.lsta.org

The Loan Syndications and Trading Association (LSTA) is a financial services trade group which exists to enhance the development and running of the North American syndicated loan market.

== Background and history ==
The advent of private equity in the 1970s had not initially seen large scale bank or credit entity debt as a critical structural component, with early buyout practitioners such as Nicholas C. Forstmann placing emphasis on equity investment and a close, collaborative relationship with a company's management. This, coupled with the industry's youth, served to contain PE investments to a comparatively small scale. However the large returns prompted new entrants to the sector. The expansion of the industry, along with the higher returns which could be earned by PE houses through employing debt in place of equity, created a market for a higher risk loan product; leveraged debt. This carried a higher risk profile than the investment grade corporate debt which had hitherto dominated corporate America.

The 1980s innovations in debt capital markets led by Michael Milken's pioneering of high yield bonds (then called 'junk bonds') served to give the industry further mass, as did certain key takeover events such as the $25bn 1988 takeover battle for RJR Nabisco. Given the higher-risk profile of leveraged loans vis investment grade debt, original bank lenders would typically syndicate the debt, selling down some or all of their loans to other debt providers.

The LSTA was founded in New York City (the focus point for America's loan market) on 26 December 1995 as the Debt Traders Association, Inc., before changing its name on 28 June 1996 to the Loan Syndications and Trading Association, Inc. to serve as an industry association for the sector, and to enhance its running and advocate for its expansion. The LSTA's involvement in corporate debt is not solely limited to private equity, but corporate debt more generally.

== Objective and work ==
The LSTA's mission statement is to "promote a fair, orderly, efficient, and growing corporate loan market and provide leadership in advancing and balancing the interests of all market participants".

For this purpose the LSTA publishes standardised precedent documents to be used in loan creation (as the Loan Market Association does for EMEA), provides training seminars, and engages in public relations.

== Governance ==
The LSTA is headed by a Chief Executive Officer & Executive Director, currently Sean P. Griffin. Its main governance body is the Board of Directors, comprising the main membership. The board is composed of members representing both private equity sponsors (albeit frequently through their credit arms) and lenders. As of March 2019 the Board is composed of members representing the following concerns:

- Antares Capital
- Apollo Global Management
- BofA Securities
- Barclays
- BlackRock
- Carlyle Group
- Citigroup
- Credit Suisse
- CVC Capital Partners
- Deutsche Bank
- Eaton Vance
- Goldman Sachs
- Invesco
- JPMorgan Chase
- KKR
- Morgan Stanley
- Neuberger Berman
- Oak Hill Advisors
- PNC Bank
- Royal Bank of Canada
- Shenkman Capital Management
- Voya Investment
- Wells Fargo

== Composition ==
LSTA membership is both buy- and sell-side, comprising both lenders (traditionally banks, but now also credit funds) and sponsors, as well as auxiliary operators in the syndicated loan market such as professional services firms (for example PricewaterhouseCoopers), ratings agencies such as Fitch, and law firms active in the lending/private equity space (for instance Kirkland & Ellis and Clifford Chance).

There are three classes of membership: full members, associate members, and affiliate members. Full and associate members are typically market participants, whilst associate members are entities which have a strong interest in the market but which are not themselves market participants, such as law firms.

The costs of the LSTA are borne by its membership. There are approximately 280 different members, all of them corporate or similar entities.

== See also ==
- Loan Market Association, the equivalent body for the United Kingdom, Europe, the Middle East and Africa, and parts of Asia.
