= Loan Market Association =

The Loan Market Association (LMA) was formed in December 1996 and is based in London, UK. Its initial aim was to develop the secondary loan market in Europe by creating industry best practices and standard documentation. The LMA is active in the primary market as well as the secondary market.

== Role ==
The LMA engages with its members, market participants and various stakeholders to tackle industry-wide issues and concerns and works with tax authorities, government bodies and a variety of national, European and US regulators.

== Membership ==
The LMA has over 770 members from 67 different jurisdictions. Members pay a subscription fee to the LMA in exchange for predefined membership benefits.
