= Bookrunner =

Underwriter in investment banking

In investment banking, a bookrunner is usually the main underwriter or lead-manager/arranger/coordinator in equity, debt, or hybrid securities issuances. The bookrunner usually syndicates with other investment banks in order to lower its risk. The bookrunner is listed first among all underwriters participating in the issuance. When more than one bookrunner manages a security issuance, the parties are referred to as "joint bookrunners", or a "multi-bookrunner syndicate".

The bank that runs the books is the closest one to the issuer and controls the allocations of shares to investors, holding significant discretion in doing so, which places the bookrunner in a very favored position.
