= SOFR =

Interbank overnight interest rate and reference rate

Secured Overnight Financing Rate (SOFR) is a secured overnight interest rate. SOFR is a reference rate (that is, a rate used by parties in commercial contracts that is outside their direct control) established as an alternative to LIBOR. LIBOR had been published in a number of currencies and underpins financial contracts all over the world. Deeming it prone to manipulation, UK regulators decided to discontinue LIBOR in 2021.

In 2022, the LIBOR Act passed by the U.S. Congress established SOFR as a default replacement rate for LIBOR contracts that lack mechanisms to deal with LIBOR's cessation. The Act also grants a safe harbor to LIBOR contracts that transition to SOFR. Previously, SOFR was seen as the likely successor of LIBOR in the US since at least 2021.

SOFR uses actual costs of transactions in the overnight repo market, calculated by the New York Federal Reserve. With US government bonds serving as collateral for borrowing, SOFR is calculated differently from LIBOR and is considered a less risky rate. The less risky nature of SOFR may result in lower borrowing costs for companies. In addition, unlike the forward-looking LIBOR (which can be calculated for 3, 6 or 12 months into the future), SOFR is calculated based on past transactions, which limits the rate's predictive value on future interest rates. In addition, SOFR is overnight, whereas LIBOR can have longer tenures.

== History ==
In 2012, revelations emerged about the manipulation of the London Interbank Offered Rate (LIBOR) by various global banks. This scandal led to a significant shift in regulatory attitudes towards LIBOR, which was deeply embedded in the financial system due to its connection with approximately $300 trillion worth of loans, derivatives, and other financial instruments across multiple currencies. Contributing to the concerns was the noticeable decrease in the volume of transactions underpinning the benchmark. Consequently, UK financial regulators established a deadline of 2021 for financial firms and investors to complete their transition away from the LIBOR.

In June 2017, US Federal Reserve Bank's Alternative Reference Rates Committee selected SOFR as the preferred alternative to Libor. The committee noted the stability of the repurchase market on which the rate is based. The New York Federal Reserve began publication of the rate in April 2018.

Fannie Mae issued $6 billion securities tied to SOFR in July 2018. Again in October 2018, Fannie Mae issued a second $ 5 billion securities that was also similarly tied to SOFR.

In August 2018, Barclays became the first bank to issue commercial paper tied to the rate; selling some US $525 million of short-term debt.

In July 2019, the SEC and the President of the New York Federal Reserve John Williams called on banks to swiftly transition from Libor to its replacements, such as SOFR, instead of waiting until the 2021 deadline. If a smooth transition from Libor cannot take place, smaller banks may reduce lending and companies may be less capable of hedging interest rate risks. Public dollar bonds linked to the SOFR were sold by the Bank of China (in October 2019), the World Bank (in February 2021) and by the Korea Development Bank (in March 2021).

Companies are required to transition away from LIBOR on new contracts after Dec. 31, 2021, and for legacy contracts after June 30, 2023.

=== LIBOR Act (2022) ===
On March 15, 2022, U.S. President Joe Biden signed the Adjustable Interest Rate (LIBOR) Act. The LIBOR Act will transition certain contracts that lack mechanisms to deal with the cessation of LIBOR, replacing LIBOR with SOFR in such contracts, effective July 1, 2023. The federal LIBOR Act is similar to prior legislation passed in New York State in 2021, but is broader as it applies across the United States, not just contracts under New York law.

As different versions of SOFR exist, such as Term SOFR and compounded SOFR, the LIBOR Act requires the Federal Reserve to issue a regulation by September 2022, to identify which version of SOFR will apply to contracts subject to the legislation. As LIBOR is based on unsecured loans made to banks, whereas SOFR is a loan secured by Treasuries, the Federal Reserve is required to add spread adjustments to SOFR (one for each tenor of LIBOR) to account for the difference in credit-risk between the rates.

The Act is seen as an important milestone in the transition away from LIBOR. However, the Act has important limitations. For example, it generally only applies to contracts that lack a non-LIBOR replacement rate, so if another rate is already selected, like the Prime Rate, or Fed Funds rate, then the Act would not apply.

== Technical features ==
SOFR is based on the Treasury repurchase market (repo), Treasuries loaned or borrowed overnight. SOFR uses data from overnight Treasury repo activity to calculate a rate published at approximately 8:00 a.m. New York time on the next business day by the US Federal Reserve Bank of New York.

Unlike Libor, SOFR uses banks' actual borrowing costs rather than unverifiable estimates submitted by a panel of banks. However, it may still be vulnerable to manipulation. Banks can borrow and lend at biased rates in the wholesale funding market, which can lead them to profit in the much larger market for benchmark-indexed contracts. It was therefore suggested that the lending costs of individual banks be published to increase transparency and deter manipulation.

The Bank for International Settlements, which serves as the bank for central banks, said in March 2019 that a one-size-fits-all alternative may be neither feasible nor desirable. Although SOFR solves the rigging problem, it does not help participants gauge how stressed global funding markets are. That means SOFR is likely to coexist with something else.

== See also ==
- AMERIBOR
- SOFR Academy
