= Underwriting =

Financial practice supporting a contract's value

Underwriting (UW) services are provided by some large financial institutions, such as banks, insurance companies and investment houses, whereby they guarantee payment in case of damage or financial loss and accept the financial risk for liability arising from such guarantee. An underwriting arrangement may be created in a number of situations including insurance, issues of security in a public offering, and bank lending, among others. The person or institution that agrees to sell a minimum number of securities of the company for commission is called the underwriter.

== History ==
The term "underwriting" derives from the Lloyd's of London insurance market. Financial backers (or risk takers), who would accept some of the risk on a given venture (historically a sea voyage with associated risks of shipwreck) in exchange for a premium, would literally write their names under the risk information that was written on a Lloyd's slip created for this purpose.

== Securities underwriting ==
In the financial primary market, securities underwriting is the process by which investment banks raise investment capital from buyers on behalf of corporations and governments by issuing securities (such as stocks or bonds). As an underwriter, the investment bank guarantees a price for these securities, facilitates the issuance of the securities, and then sells them to the public (or retains them for their own proprietary account). This process is often seen in initial public offerings (IPOs), where investment banks help a corporation raise funds from the public. The underwriter is obligated to purchase the entire issue at a predetermined price before reselling the securities in the market. Should they not be able to find buyers, they will have to hold some securities themselves. To reduce the risk, they may form a syndicate with other investment banks. Each bank will buy a portion of the security issue, and typically resell securities from that portion to the public. Underwriters make their profit from the price difference (called "underwriting spread") between the price they pay the issuer and what they collect from buyers or from broker-dealers who buy portions of the offering.

The services provided in the process of underwriting include:

1. Giving advice on whether to issue stocks or bonds, the timing of issuance (ideally, corporations should sell securities when they will obtain the highest possible price). Underwriters also have to determine at what price the security should be sold.
2. Filing documents: assisting companies with making the filings required by financial authorities. Companies issuing new securities to the general public must file a registration statement detailing their financial conditions, management, competition, industry, experience, funding purposes, and securities' risk assessment. A portion of this statement is reproduced in a document called a prospectus, which investors can access to obtain information about new securities.
3. Underwriting: A company sells the entire issue to the underwriter at an agreed price. The underwriter will then sell it to the public at a higher price to achieve a profit, to the extent that it does not retain part of the issue as a proprietary holding.

=== Risk, exclusivity, and reward ===
Once the underwriting agreement is struck, the underwriter bears the risk of being unable to sell the underlying securities, and the cost of holding them on its books until such time in the future that they may be favorably sold.

If the instrument is desirable, the underwriter and the securities issuer may choose to enter into an exclusivity agreement. In exchange for a higher price paid upfront to the issuer, or other favorable terms, the issuer may agree to make the underwriter the exclusive agent for the initial sale of the securities instrument. That is, even though third-party buyers might approach the issuer directly to buy, the issuer agrees to sell exclusively through the underwriter.

In summary, the securities issuer gets cash up front, access to the contacts and sales channels of the underwriter, and is insulated from the market risk of being unable to sell the securities at a good price. The underwriter receives a profit from the markup, plus the possibility of an exclusive sales agreement.

Also, if the securities are priced significantly below market price (as is often the custom), the underwriter also curries favor with powerful customers by granting them an immediate profit (see flipping), perhaps in a quid pro quo. This practice, which is typically justified as the reward for the underwriter for taking on the market risk, is occasionally criticized as unethical, such as the allegations that investment banker Frank Quattrone acted improperly in doling out hot IPO stock during the dot-com bubble.

In an attempt to capture more of the value of their securities for themselves, issuing companies are increasingly turning to alternative vehicles for going public, such as direct listings and SPACs.

== Bank underwriting ==
In banking, underwriting is the detailed credit analysis preceding the granting of a loan, based on credit information furnished by the borrower; such underwriting falls into several areas:

- Consumer loan underwriting includes the verification of such items as employment history, salary and financial statements; publicly available information, such as the borrower's credit history, which is detailed in a credit report; and the lender's evaluation of the borrower's credit needs and ability to pay. Examples include mortgage underwriting.
- Commercial (or business) underwriting consists of the evaluation of financial information provided by small businesses including analysis of the business balance sheet including tangible net worth, the ratio of debt to worth (leverage) and available liquidity (current ratio). Analysis of the income statement typically includes revenue trends, gross margin, profitability, and debt service coverage.

Underwriting can also refer to the purchase of corporate bonds, commercial paper, government securities, municipal general-obligation bonds by a commercial bank or dealer bank for its own account or for resale to investors. Bank underwriting of corporate securities is carried out through separate holding-company affiliates, called securities affiliates or Section 20 affiliates.

Machine learning is being applied to underwriting, replacing traditional scorecards and some human underwriters. Natural language understanding allows the consideration of more sources of information to assess risk than used previously. These algorithms typically use modern data sources such as SMS / Email for banking information, location data to verify addresses, and so on. Several firms are trying to build models that can gauge a customer's willingness to pay using social media data by applying natural language understanding algorithms which essentially try to analyse and quantify a person's popularity / likability and so on, with the premise being that people scoring high on these parameters are less likely to default on a loan. However, this area is still vastly subjective.

== Insurance underwriting ==
Insurance underwriters evaluate the risk and exposures of potential clients. They decide how much coverage the client should receive, how much they should pay for it, and whether to accept the risk. Underwriting involves measuring risk exposure and determining the premium that needs to be charged to insure that risk. The function of the underwriter is to protect the company's book of business from risks that they feel will make a loss and issue insurance policies at a premium that is commensurate with the exposure presented by a risk.

Each insurance company has its own set of underwriting guidelines to help the underwriter determine whether or not the company should accept the risk. The information used to evaluate the risk of an applicant for insurance will depend on the type of coverage involved. For example, in underwriting automobile coverage, an individual's driving record is critical. However, the type of automobile is actually far more critical. As part of the underwriting process for life or health insurance, medical underwriting may be used to examine the applicant's health status (other factors may be considered as well, such as occupation and risky pursuits) and decide whether the policy can be issued on the standard terms applicable to the customer's age. The factors that insurers use to classify risks are generally objective, clearly related to the likely cost of providing coverage, practical to administer, consistent with applicable law, and designed to protect the long-term viability of the insurance program.

Underwriters may choose to decline a risk, provide a quotation with adjusted premiums, or apply policy exclusions. Adjusted premiums typically include a loading factor, which accounts for administrative costs, expected claims, and a margin for profit. Policy exclusions, on the other hand, limit the circumstances under which claims can be made. Depending on the type of insurance product (line of business), insurance companies use automated underwriting systems to encode these rules, and reduce the amount of manual work in processing quotations and policy issuance. This is especially the case for certain simpler life or personal lines (auto, homeowners) insurance. Some insurance companies, however, rely on agents to underwrite for them. This arrangement allows an insurer to operate in a market closer to its clients without having to establish a physical presence.

Two major categories of exclusion in insurance underwriting are moral hazard and correlated losses. With a moral hazard, the consequences of the customer's actions are insured, making the customer more likely to take costly actions. For example, bedbugs are typically excluded from homeowners' insurance to avoid paying for the consequence of recklessly bringing in a used mattress. Insured events are generally those outside the control of the customer, for example in life insurance, death by automobile accident is typically covered, but death by suicide is typically not covered. Correlated losses are those that can affect a large number of customers at the same time, thus potentially bankrupting the insurance company. This is why typical homeowner's policies cover damage from fire or falling trees (usually affecting an individual house), but not floods or earthquakes (which affect many houses at the same time).

For all types of insurance underwriting, advice and assistance is often provided by reinsurers, who of course have an interest in accepting risks on appropriate terms. See Financial risk management § Insurance.

== Other forms ==
=== Continuous underwriting ===
Continuous underwriting is the process in which the risks involved in insuring people or assets are being evaluated and analyzed on a continuous basis. It evolved from the traditional underwriting, in which the risks only get assessed before the policy is signed or renewed. Continuous underwriting was first used in workers' compensation, where the premium of the insurance was updated monthly, based on the insured's submitted payroll. It is also used in life insurance and cyber insurance.

=== Real estate underwriting ===
Real estate underwriting is the evaluation of a real estate investment, either of equity ownership or of a real estate loan. The underwriting process generally involves a detailed analysis of expected cash flows, the local market, supply and demand, and risks such as the physical state of the property, environmental or geotechnical risks, zoning, taxes, and insurance. In the evaluation of a real estate loan, lenders assess both the risk of lending to a specific borrower as well as the risk of the underlying real estate. Loan underwriters use various metrics including debt service coverage ratio, loan-to-value ratio, and debt yield ratio to assess out whether the property is capable of making debt service payments.

=== Forensic underwriting ===
Forensic underwriting is the "after-the-fact" process used by lenders to determine what went wrong with a mortgage. Forensic underwriting is a borrower's ability to work out a modification scenario with their current lien holder, not to qualify them for a new loan or a refinance. This is typically done by an underwriter staffed with a team of people who are experienced in every aspect of the real estate field.

=== Sponsorship underwriting ===
Underwriting may also refer to financial sponsorship of a venture, and is also used as a term within public broadcasting (both public television and radio) to describe funding given by a company or organization for the operations of the service, in exchange for a mention of their product or service within the station's programming.

=== Thomson Financial league tables ===
Underwriting activity in the mergers and acquisitions, equity issuance, debt issuance, syndicated loans and U.S. municipal bond markets is reported in the Thomson Financial league tables.

== See also ==
- Bookrunner
- Book building
- Financial roadshows
- Guidewire Software
- Predictive analytics
- Underwriting contract
