= Stub period =

Bonds/swaps anomaly

In finance, in particular with reference to bonds and swaps, a stub period is a length of time over which interest accrues are not equal to the usual interval between bond coupons.

These periods normally occur because the interval between coupons does not fit neatly into the period for which the bond was issued, thus sometimes a bond's final or first coupon period may be adjusted to make the bond start and mature on the desired dates.

== Interest calculation ==
A stub period affects the amount of coupon or interest payable because the period is shorter or longer than the regular coupon interval. In bond markets, the interest amount for an irregular period is normally calculated using the applicable day count convention, which determines how days are counted and how the fraction of the coupon period is measured.

In interest rate derivatives, stub periods may also require special rate-setting treatment. For example, market practice may use linear interpolation between two reference tenors when determining a rate for a short or long stub period in a swap transaction.
