= Oid =

Oid or OID may refer to:

- Oid, a 2005 album by Space Manoeuvres
- Object identifier, an object used in computing to name an object
- Oracle Internet Directory, a directory service produced by Oracle Corporation
- OpenID, a shared identity service
- Original issue discount, implicit interest on a discounted debt

== See also ==
- Ooid, sedimentary grains
