= Serial bond =

Serial bonds are financial bonds that mature in installments over a period of time. In effect, a $100,000, 5-year serial bond would mature in a $20,000 annuity over a 5-year interval. These are bond issues consisting of a series of securities blocks which mature in sequence, and the coupon rate for these various blocks can be different.
