= Forbearance =

Agreement between a lender and a borrower to delay foreclosure

Forbearance, is a "holding back". In the context of a mortgage process, is a special agreement between the lender and the borrower to delay a foreclosure, also known as mortgage moratorium.

== Application and use ==
When mortgage borrowers are unable to meet their repayment terms, lenders may opt to foreclose. To avoid foreclosure, the lender and the borrower can make an agreement called "forbearance." According to this agreement, the lender delays its right to exercise foreclosure if the borrower can catch up to its payment schedule by a certain time. This period and the payment plan depend on the details of the agreement that is accepted by both parties.

=== During COVID-19 pandemic ===
Historically, forbearance has been granted for customers in temporary or short-term financial difficulty. If the borrower has more serious problems, e. g. the return to full mortgage payments in the long term does not appear sustainable, then forbearance is usually not a solution. Each lender is likely to have its own suite of forbearance products. In response to COVID-19 government sponsored mortgage loans in the United States qualified for forbearance plans in compliance with the CARES Act. These plans were for borrowers impacted by COVID-19. At the end of the forbearance period the consumer was required to participate in a work-out plan and the options include bringing the mortgage payments current, paying the loan in full, a mortgage modification plan, deferral of payments until the end of the loan or increased monthly payments to cure the arrearage. A forbearance is not forgiveness and interest continues to accrue and if a final work out arrangement is not adopted foreclosure later down the line can be pursued by the lender. These agreements do not block credit bureau reporting and the Government Sponsored Agencies ("GSE's) have provide guidance that the lender must report the mortgage status which will reflect the delinquency and past due payments.

== Types of forbearance in US ==
Examples of the types of forbearance which lenders may potentially consider include:

1. A full moratorium on payments
2. Reduced payments:
  - Above Interest-Only (termed Positive-Amortising)
  - Below Interest-Only (Negative-Amortising)
  - Interest Only
3. Reduced interest rate
4. Split Mortgage

It needs to be understood that the type of forbearance being granted is being provided based on the customer's individual circumstances. For example, borrowers in short-term financial difficulty would be more likely to be approved of either a (short term) full moratorium or negative-amortising deal than customers in long-term financial difficulty, where the lender would at all times seek to ensure that the capital balance continues to be reduced (via an amortising forbearance arrangement). Negative-amortising forbearance arrangements are only suitable as short-term deals since failure to pay interest timely and/or on the whole loan balance is effectively additional borrowing. Depending on the parameters of the agreement consumers can be held fully responsible for paying the entire amount due after the duration of the forbearance.

A lender who grants a forbearance is refraining from enforcing its right to realize interest on securities under their agreement or contract with the borrower. This is done to assist the borrower in returning to a performing financial position as well as better position the lender to realize its security should the borrower fail to perform. The borrower does not escape their debt obligations by accepting the agreed forbearance amount and/or terms. On expiry of the agreed forbearance period the loan account reverts to its original form. In many instances, upon expiration of the forbearance period, the difference between the level of forbearance granted and the full repayment (which was missed) is recalculated over the remaining term and the customer's new repayment is based on the current loan balance, rate and term.

Some exceptions to this is where a reduced rate was given (where the possible intention here to reduce the capital balance as quickly as possible, thereby reducing the loan to value) or where the type of forbearance is for the lifetime of the loan, i.e. a split loan where 1 part of the loan is parked until the expiry date, with the intention that at that time a suitable repayment vehicle (say, sale of asset) is in place for the repayment of the loan in full.

The GSE's released payment policies in April 2020 that clarified the terms of the COVID-19 forbearance plans. The announcement clarified that while full payment of arrears was an option to reinstate consumers are never required to choose a lump sum option. It reiterated the four options of full repayment, a repayment plan over time, a deferral to move the payments to the end of the loan, or a modification of the loan for more permanent hardships. The guidance specified owners facing hardships would start with shorter duration plans but those could be extended up to 12 months if necessary after reassessing the consumers financial hardship. The GSE's are also waiving late fees and suspending foreclosure sales and evictions until May 17, 2020.

The COVID -19 policy requires the lenders to make contact with the consumer to obtain specifics of the scenario and to perform an assessment of the hardship and ability to repay. Verbal conversations should be validated and documented through email correspondence and written agreements as applicable.

== In other countries ==
The term 'forbearance' is addressed by different names in different countries. The norms of a foreclosure agreement also vary. For example, in Australia, banks offer 'hardship variation' to borrowers struggling financially. Borrowers can ask their lenders to make changes to the terms of their loans.

Borrowers can either opt for a short-term relief by having their mortgage payment suspended for a short period of time (known as forbearance in the U.S.), or they can apply for reduced payments over the life of the loan's term (known as loan modification in the U.S.). Lenders are required to give a particular reason as to why an application for hardship variation was being turned down by them. Borrowers are encouraged to talk to their internal complaints section of their respective bank or file a dispute.

In many nations, banks typically allow temporary interest-only payments rather than suspending the full amount of the installment. The Bank of Spain (Banco de España) – the country's de facto central bank – discourages banks from keeping mortgages in arrears. For that reason, banks are not required to offer any relief to borrowers. Banks can repossess properties without agreeing to changes in terms of the loan that might help a customer.
