= Original issue discount =

Implicit interest on a discounted debt

Original Issue Discount (OID) is a type of interest that is not payable as it accrues. OID is normally created when a debt, usually a bond, is issued at a discount. In effect, selling a bond at a discount converts stated principal into a return on investment, or interest. The accurate determination of principal and interest is necessary in United States tax law to determine the basis of property and to determine whether an amount paid is deductible and includible as interest, or simply a nontaxable debt repayment.

== Example ==
Most loans require interest payments. Loans that require inadequate or no interest payments bear original issue discount. In the United States, whether interest is adequate is determined with reference to the applicable federal rate (AFR). Under the Internal Revenue Code, original issue discounts on debt instruments are taxed each year, even though the debt may not be repaid until a later date. The tax system will impute an interest rate on the loan. The rules for calculating the original issue discount utilize a compounding interest formula, with the principal recalculated every six months. Section 1272(a) of the tax code requires that the Original Issue Discount is includible in the lender's taxable income at the end of each tax year, or part of the tax year if the loan was not owned for the full year.

Bond Issuance Price	$7,462
Bond Redemption Price	$10,000
Original Issue Discount	$2,538

The daily portion of the discount uses a compounded interest formula with the principal recalculated every six months. The following table illustrates how to calculate the original issue discount for a $7,462 bond with a $10,000 repayment and a three-year maturity date:

Period	Adjusted Issue Price	Yield	Original Issue Discount
1	$7,462	.05	$373
2	$7,835	.05	$392
3	$8,227	.05	$411
4	$8,638	.05	$432
5	$9,070	.05	$454
6	$9,524	.05	$476
Redemption	$10,000		

== United States tax ==
The portion of the loan that is repaid consists of a repayment of capital and a payment of interest. Original issue discount rules separate the portion of the repayment that is attributable to interest and then taxes that amount at ordinary income rates. These rules prevent the avoidance of tax that might otherwise be available by characterizing the repayment as a capital gain, which is taxed at a lower rate, or by deferring the recognition of income until the bond is repaid at maturity.

There are a number of exceptions to the original issue discount rule, including:

- Tax exempt obligations
- United States savings bonds
- Short-term obligations (less than 1 year to maturity)
- Obligations fixed by natural persons before 3/2/1984
- Loans between natural persons
