= Date rolling =

Payment date terms in finance

In finance, date rolling occurs when a payment day or date used to calculate accrued interest falls on a holiday, according to a given business calendar. In this case, the date is moved forward or backward in time such that it falls in a business day, according to the same business calendar.

The choice of the date rolling rule is conventional. Conventional rules used in finance are:

- Following business day: the payment date is rolled to the next business day.
- Modified following business day: the payment date is rolled to the next business day unless doing so would cause the payment to be in the next calendar month, in which case the payment date is rolled to the previous business day. Many institutions have month-end accounting procedures that necessitate this.
- Previous business day: the payment date is rolled to the previous business day.
- Modified previous business day: the payment date is rolled to the previous business day unless doing so would cause the payment to be in the previous calendar month, in which case the payment date is rolled to the next business day. Many institutions have month-end accounting procedures that necessitate this.
- Modified Rolling business day: the payment date is rolled to the next business day. The adjusted week date is used for the next coupon date. So adjustments are cumulative (excluding month change).

Date rolling is particularly important for over-the-counter derivatives, whose payment and end dates may potentially fall on any date. For standardized derivatives, in order to avoid problems with month ends, the payment and termination dates are generally chosen to fall in the middle of the month, as in the IMM dates on futures and options contracts, and similar dates on standardized credit default swaps.

== Business day conventions ==
Date rolling rules are generally referred to in derivatives and fixed-income markets as business day conventions. The International Swaps and Derivatives Association (ISDA) uses conventions such as Following, Modified Following, and Preceding to determine how payment dates and other scheduled dates are adjusted when they fall on a non-business day.

In practice, the modified following convention is widely used for interest-rate products because it preserves the general timing of the payment while avoiding movement into the next calendar month. ISDA guidance and definitional materials use modified following as a common default for many scheduled dates in over-the-counter derivatives.

== See also ==
- Day count convention
