= Payment schedule =

The payment schedule defines the dates at which payments are made by one party to another on for example an invoice or where credit is extended to another party and its repaid at a later date. It can be either customised or parameterised.

== Parameterised schedule ==
The schedule is generated based on a set of rules and market conventions to define the frequency of the payments.

These parameters include:

- Payment Frequency (Annually, Semi Annually, Quarterly, Monthly, Weekly, Daily, Continuous)
- Payment Day - Day of the month the payment is made
- Date rolling - Rule used to adjust the payment date if the schedule date is not a Business Day
- Start Date - Date of the first Payment
- End Date - Also known as the Maturity date. The date of the last payment

== Customised schedule ==
The schedule consists of a series of dates that define exactly when payments will be made.

The payment schedule can also be linked to achievement or fulfilment of certain predefined tasks or events or even stages against which payments are required to be made by one party to another
