= Accrued interest =

Money earned on an investment with interest

In finance, accrued interest is the interest on a bond or loan that has accumulated since the principal investment, or since the previous coupon payment if there has been one already.

For a type of obligation such as a bond, interest is calculated and paid at set intervals (for instance annually or semi-annually). However ownership of bonds/loans can be transferred between different investors at any time, not just on an interest payment date, but before.

If this transfer happens befor next interest payment is made to the old owner, the new owner will usually receive the next interest payment, thefore the previous owner must be compensated for the period of time for which he or she owned the bond (since time of previous interest payment). In other words, the previous owner must be paid the interest that accrued before the sale. This is generally done in one of two ways, depending on market convention:

1. In addition to the quoted price, the buyer pays the seller an additional amount equal to the interest accrued up to the date of sale, or
2. That adjustment is not made, but the value of the accrued interest is simply reflected in a higher quoted sale price.

On the other hand, if the sale is made during a short set period immediately before the next interest payment, then the seller, not the buyer, will receive the interest payment from the issuer of the loan (the borrower), and

1. The buyer pays the seller less than the quoted price, the difference reflecting the interest accruing between the sale date and the next interest payment date, or
2. That adjustment is not made, but the value of the interest to be accrued is simply reflected in a lower quoted sale price.

== Accounting ==
In accounting, accrual-based accounting generally requires (in order to present a true and fair view) that accrued interest is computed and recorded at the end of each accounting period, perhaps by means of adjusting journal entries. This enables the accrued interest to be included in the lender's balance sheet as an asset (and in the borrower's balance sheet as a provision or liability). However if the accounts use the market price as derived by method 2 above, then such an adjustment for accrued interest is not necessary, as it has already been included in the market price.

== Formula ==
The primary formula for calculating the interest accrued in a given period is:

$$I_A = T \times P \times R$$

where $I_A$ is the accrued interest, $T$ is the fraction of the year, $P$ is the principal, and $R$ is the annualized interest rate.

$T$ is usually calculated as follows:

$T = \frac{D_P}{D_Y}$

where $D_P$ is the number of days in the period, and $D_Y$ is the number of days in the year.

The main variables that affect the calculation are the period between interest payments and the day count convention used to determine the fraction of year, and the date rolling convention in use.
