= Zero-coupon bond =

Bond where the face value is repaid at the time of maturity

A zero-coupon bond (also discount bond or deep discount bond) is a bond in which the face value is repaid at the time of maturity. Unlike regular bonds, it does not make periodic interest payments or have so-called coupons, hence the term zero-coupon bond. When the bond reaches maturity, its investor receives its par (or face) value. Examples of zero-coupon bonds include US Treasury bills, US savings bonds, long-term zero-coupon bonds, and any type of coupon bond that has been stripped of its coupons.

In contrast, an investor who has a regular bond receives income from coupon payments, which are made semi-annually or annually. The investor also receives the principal or face value of the investment when the bond matures.

Some zero coupon bonds are inflation indexed, and the amount of money that will be paid to the bond holder is calculated to have a set amount of purchasing power, rather than a set amount of money, but most zero coupon bonds pay a set amount of money known as the face value of the bond.

Zero coupon bonds may be long or short-term investments. Long-term zero coupon maturity dates typically start at ten to fifteen years. The bonds can be held until maturity or sold on secondary bond markets. Short-term zero coupon bonds generally have maturities of less than one year and are called bills. The US Treasury bill market is the most active and liquid debt market in the world.

== Strip bonds ==
Zero coupon bonds have a duration equal to the bond's time to maturity, which makes them sensitive to any changes in the interest rates. Investment banks or dealers may separate coupons from the principal of coupon bonds, which is known as the residue, so that different investors may receive the principal and each of the coupon payments. That creates a supply of new zero coupon bonds.

The coupons and residue are sold separately to investors. Each of the investments then pays a single lump sum. That method of creating zero coupon bonds is known as stripping, and the contracts are known as strip bonds. "STRIPS" stands for Separate Trading of Registered Interest and Principal Securities.

Dealers normally purchase a block of high-quality and non-callable bonds, often government issues, to create strip bonds. A strip bond has no reinvestment risk because the payment to the investor occurs only at maturity.

The impact of interest rate fluctuations on strip bonds, known as the bond duration, is higher than for a coupon bond. A zero coupon bond always has a duration equal to its maturity, and a coupon bond always has a lower duration. Strip bonds are normally available from investment dealers maturing at terms up to 30 years. For some Canadian bonds, the maturity may be over 90 years.

In Canada, investors may purchase packages of strip bonds, so that the cash flows are tailored to meet their needs in a single security. These packages may consist of a combination of interest (coupon) and/or principal strips.

In New Zealand, bonds are stripped first into two pieces—the coupons and the principal. The coupons may be traded as a unit or further subdivided into the individual payment dates.

In most countries, strip bonds are primarily administered by a central bank or central securities depository. An alternative form is to use a custodian bank or trust company to hold the underlying security and a transfer agent/registrar to track ownership in the strip bonds and to administer the program. Physically created strip bonds (where the coupons are physically clipped and then traded separately) were created in the early days of stripping in Canada and the U.S., but have virtually disappeared due to the high costs and risks associated with them.

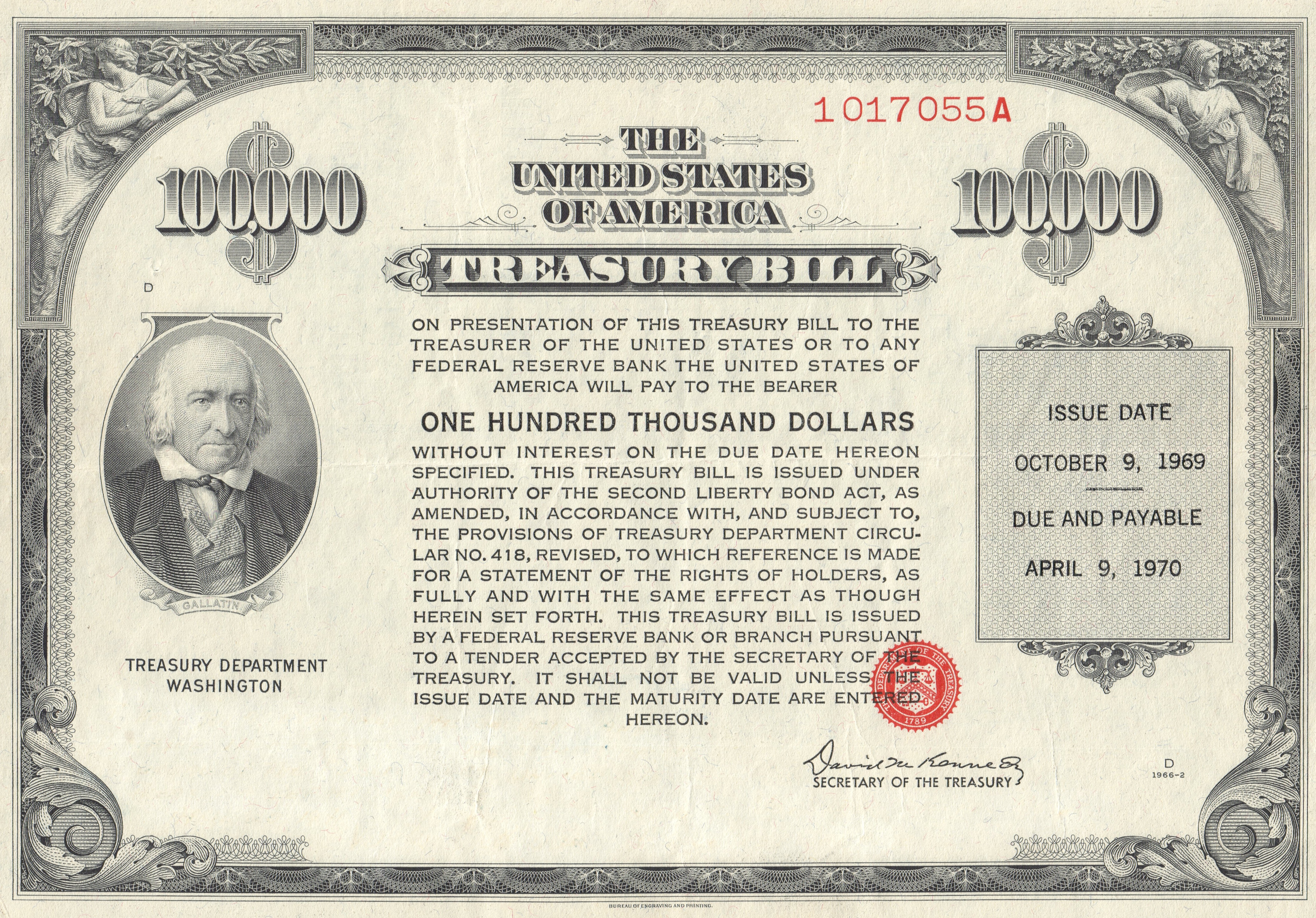
1969 $100K Treasury Bill

== Uses ==
Pension funds and insurance companies like to own long maturity zero coupon bonds because of their high duration. That means that the bonds' prices are particularly sensitive to changes in the interest rate, and so offset, or immunize, the interest rate risk of the firms' long-term liabilities.

== Taxes ==
In the United States, a zero-l coupon bond has original issue discount (OID) for tax purposes. Instruments issued with OID generally impute the receipt of interest, sometimes called phantom income, even though the bonds do not pay periodic interest.

Therefore, zero coupon bonds subject to US taxation should generally be held in tax-deferred retirement accounts, to avoid taxes being paid on future income. Alternatively, when a zero coupon bond issued by a US state or local government entity is purchased, the imputed interest is free of U.S. federal taxes and, in most cases, state and local taxes.

Zero coupon bonds were first introduced in the 1960s but did not become popular until the 1980s. The use of such instruments was aided by an anomaly in the US tax system, which allowed for deduction of the discount on bonds relative to their par value. The rule ignored the compounding of interest and led to significant tax-savings when the interest is high or the security has long maturity. Although the tax loopholes were closed quickly, the bonds themselves have remained desirable because of their simplicity.

In India, the tax on income from deep discount bonds can arise in two ways: interest or capital gains. It is also a law that interest has to be shown on an accrual basis for deep discount bonds issued after February 2002, as per CBDT circular No 2 of 2002, dated 15 February 2002.

== See also ==
- Interest only
- Principal only
- Z-spread
- Zero coupon swap
- Zero rate
