= Coupon (finance) =

Interest payment

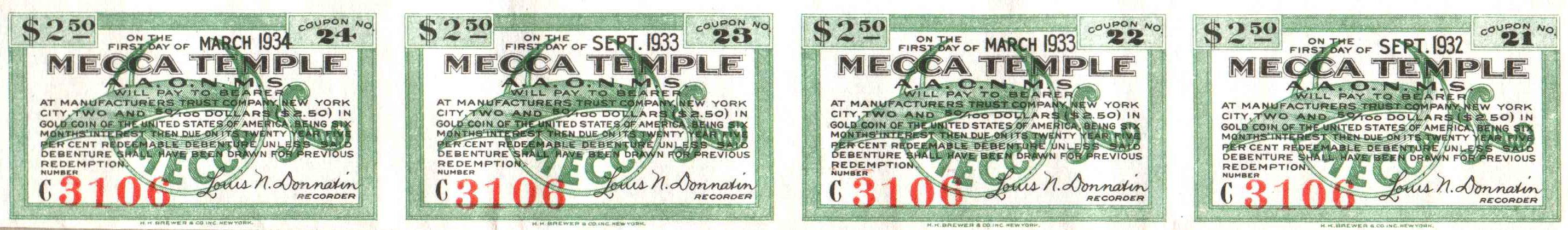
Uncut bond coupons on 1922 Mecca Temple (NY, NY, U.S.A.) construction bond

In finance, a coupon is the interest payment that a bond issuer promises to pay a bondholder regularly from the date of issuance until the date of maturity of a bond.

Coupons are normally described in terms of the "coupon rate", which is calculated by adding the sum of coupons paid per year and dividing it by the bond's face value. For example, if a bond has a face value of $1,000 and a coupon rate of 5% (per year), then it pays total coupons of $50 per year. Typically, this will consist of two semi-annual payments of $25 each.

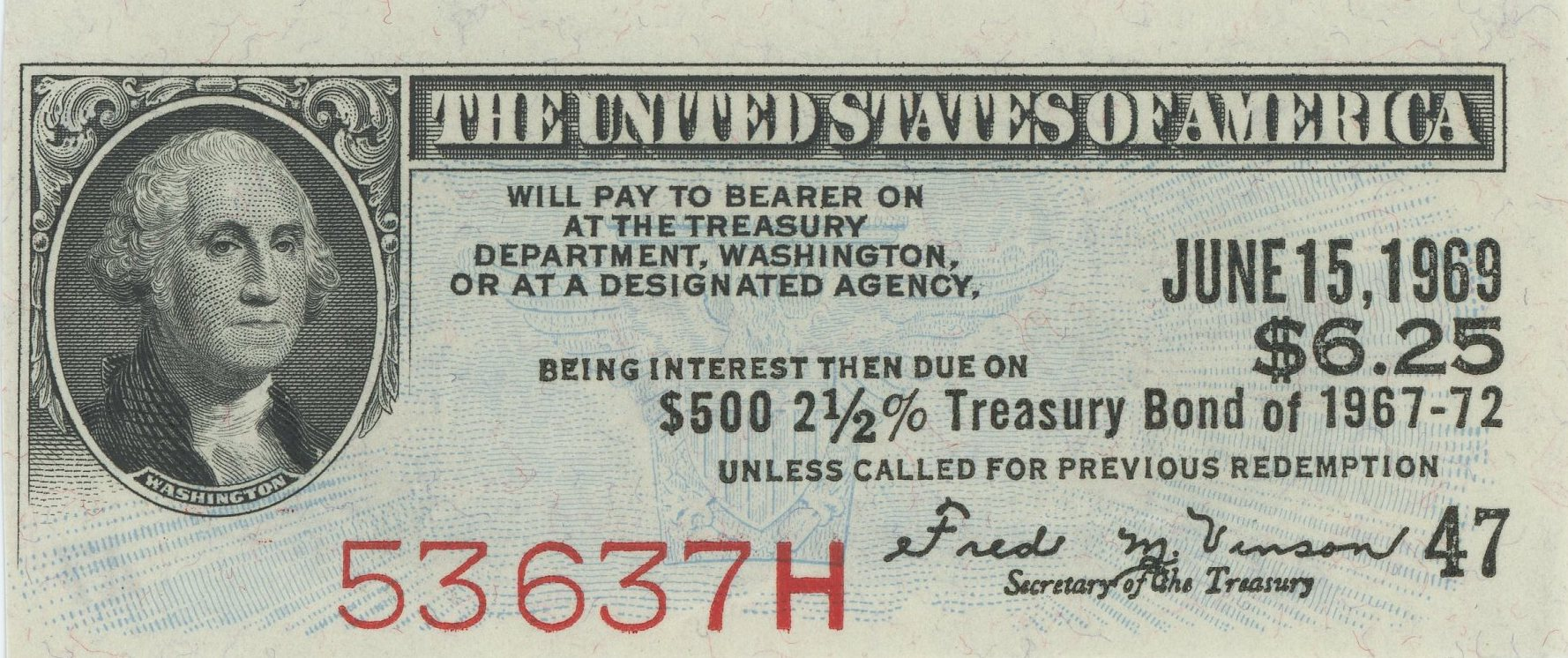
1945 2.5% $500 Treasury Bond coupon

== History ==
The origin of the term "coupon" is that bonds were historically issued in the form of bearer certificates. Physical possession of the certificate was (deemed) proof of ownership. Several coupons, one for each scheduled interest payment, were printed on the certificate. At the date the coupon was due, the owner would detach the coupon and present it for payment (an act called "clipping the coupon").

The certificate often also contained a document called a talon, which (when the original block of coupons had been used up) could be detached and presented in exchange for a block of further coupons.

== Zero-coupon bonds ==
Not all bonds have coupons. Zero-coupon bonds are those that pay no coupons and thus have a coupon rate of 0%. Such bonds make only one payment: the payment of the face value on the maturity date. Normally, to compensate the bondholder for the time value of money, the price of a zero-coupon bond will always be less than its face value on any date of purchase before the maturity date. During the European sovereign-debt crisis, some zero-coupon sovereign bonds traded above their face value as investors were willing to pay a premium for the perceived safe-haven status these investments hold. The difference between the price and the face value provides the bondholder with the positive return that makes purchasing the bond worthwhile.

== Valuation ==
Between a bond's issue date and its maturity date (also called its redemption date), the bond's price is determined by taking into account several factors, including:

- The face value;
- The maturity date;
- The coupon rate, frequency of coupon payments, and day count convention;
- The creditworthiness of the issuer; and
- The yield on comparable investment options.

== See also ==
- Credit
- Credit spread (options)
- TED spread
- Yield curve
