= Piastowski Square, Bydgoszcz =

Townsquare in Bydgoszcz, Poland

Coordinates: 53°07′54″N 17°59′53″E

Piastowski Square
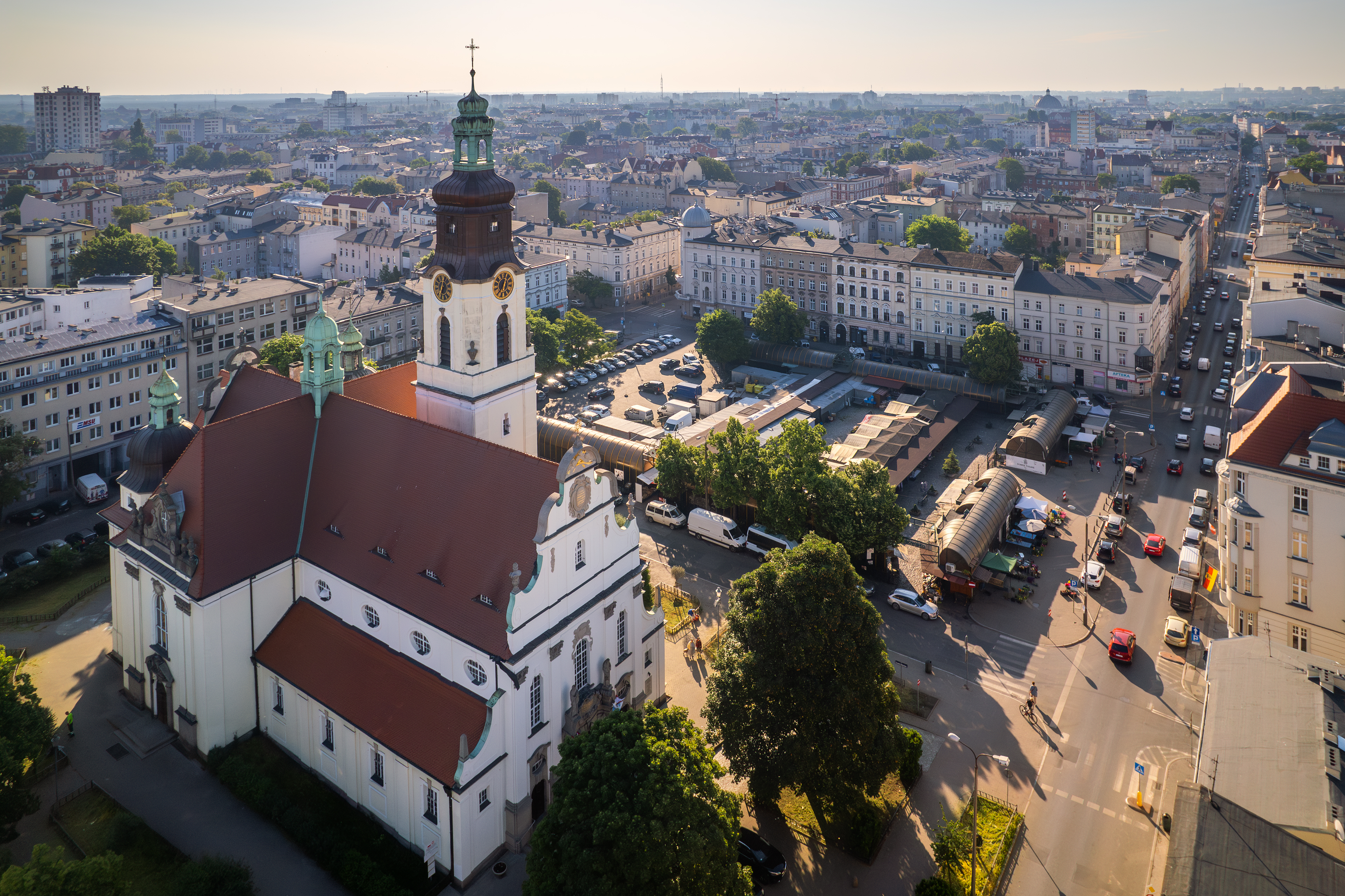
- Bird eye view

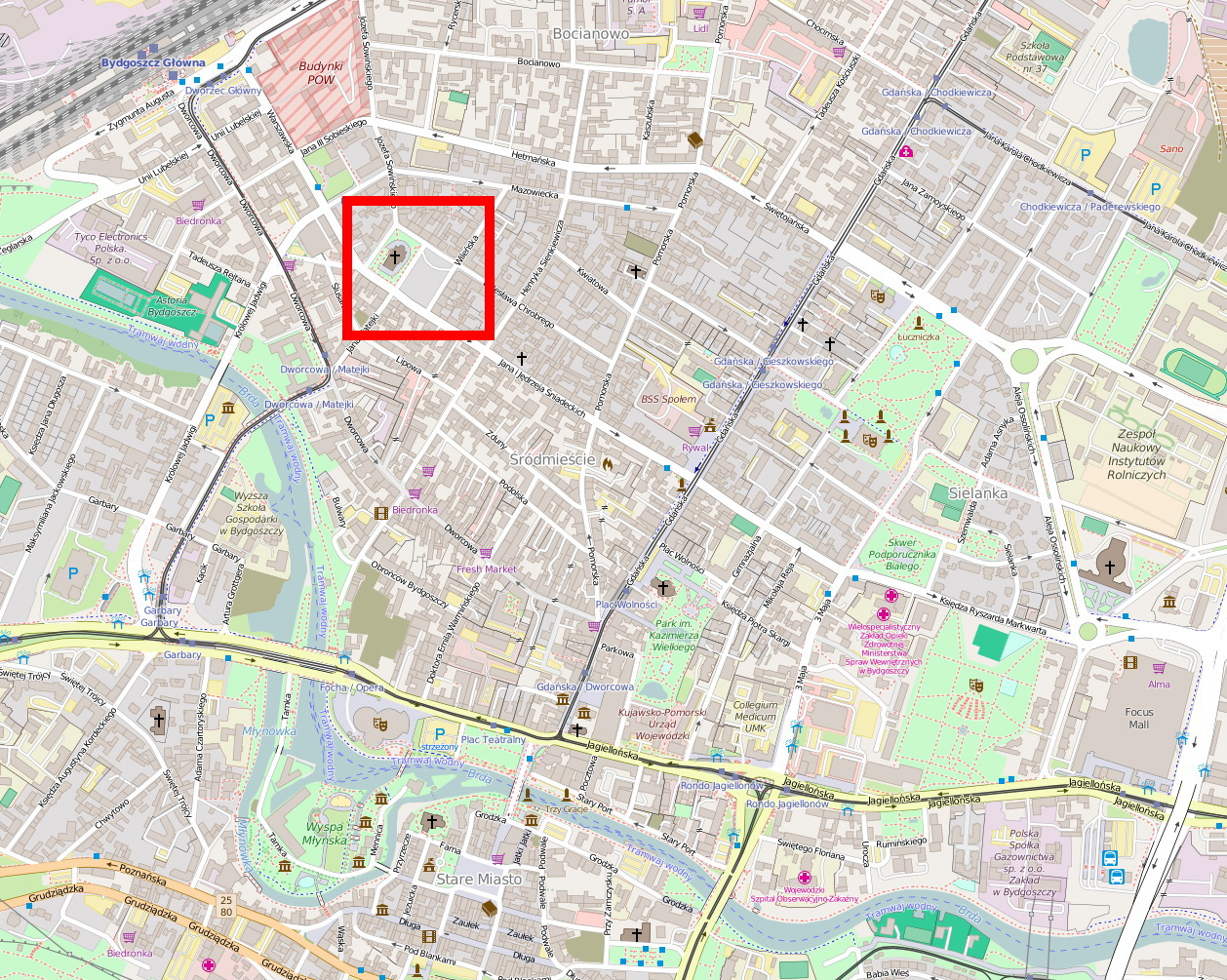
- Location in Bydgoszcz
- Native name: Plac Piastowski w Bydgoszczy (Polish)
- Former names: Elisabeth Markt, Dr. Goebbels Platz
- Type: Square
- Owner: City of Bydgoszcz
- Location: Bydgoszcz, Poland

Piastowski Square is a large and important square in downtown Bydgoszcz, bearing several buildings registered on the Kuyavian-Pomeranian Voivodeship Heritage List.

== Location ==
Piastowski Square is settled north of Dworcowa Street, west of Gdańska Street. It is delineated by Śniadecki, Chrobrego, Wileńska and Sowińskiego streets.

It has approximately the size of a 140m by 100m rectangle, with its longer axis oriented NW-SE.

== History ==
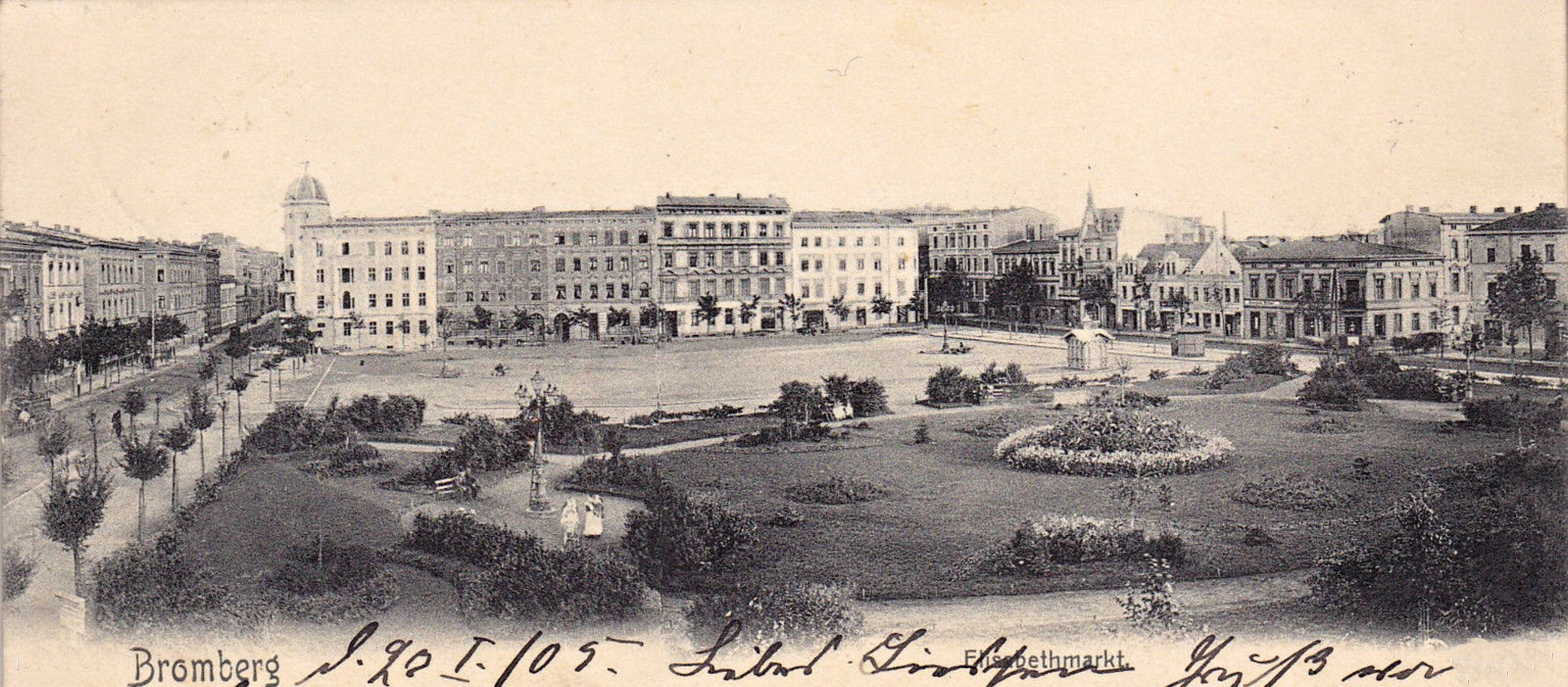
View of the square ca 1902

This vast square dates back to the creation of Sniadecki Street, after the second half of the 19th century. It has always kept its original functions, as a marketplace, hence its original name Elisabethmarkt, after Elisabeth Straße, original name of Sniadecki Street.

The area is roughly depicted on an 1857 map of Bromberg, but earliest documented reference appears in the 1870s, with a mention in the 1872 city address book.

Through history, the square bore the following names:

- 1870s-1920, Elisabeth Markt, in honor of Elisabeth Ludovika of Bavaria, wife of the reigning King of Prussia, Frederick William IV of Prussia;
- 1920–1940, Piastowski Square;
- 1940–1945, Dr. Goebbels Platz;
- Since 1945, Piastowski Square (Polish: Plac Piastowski).

The current namesake comes from the Piast dynasty, first historical ruling dynasty of Poland, which started with Prince Miesko I in 960 and ended with Casimir III the Great in 1370.

== Main places and buildings ==
=== Tenement at 1, corner with Sowińskiego Street ===
1889

Eclecticism

The first owner of the building at 10 Elisabeth Markt was August Zuß.

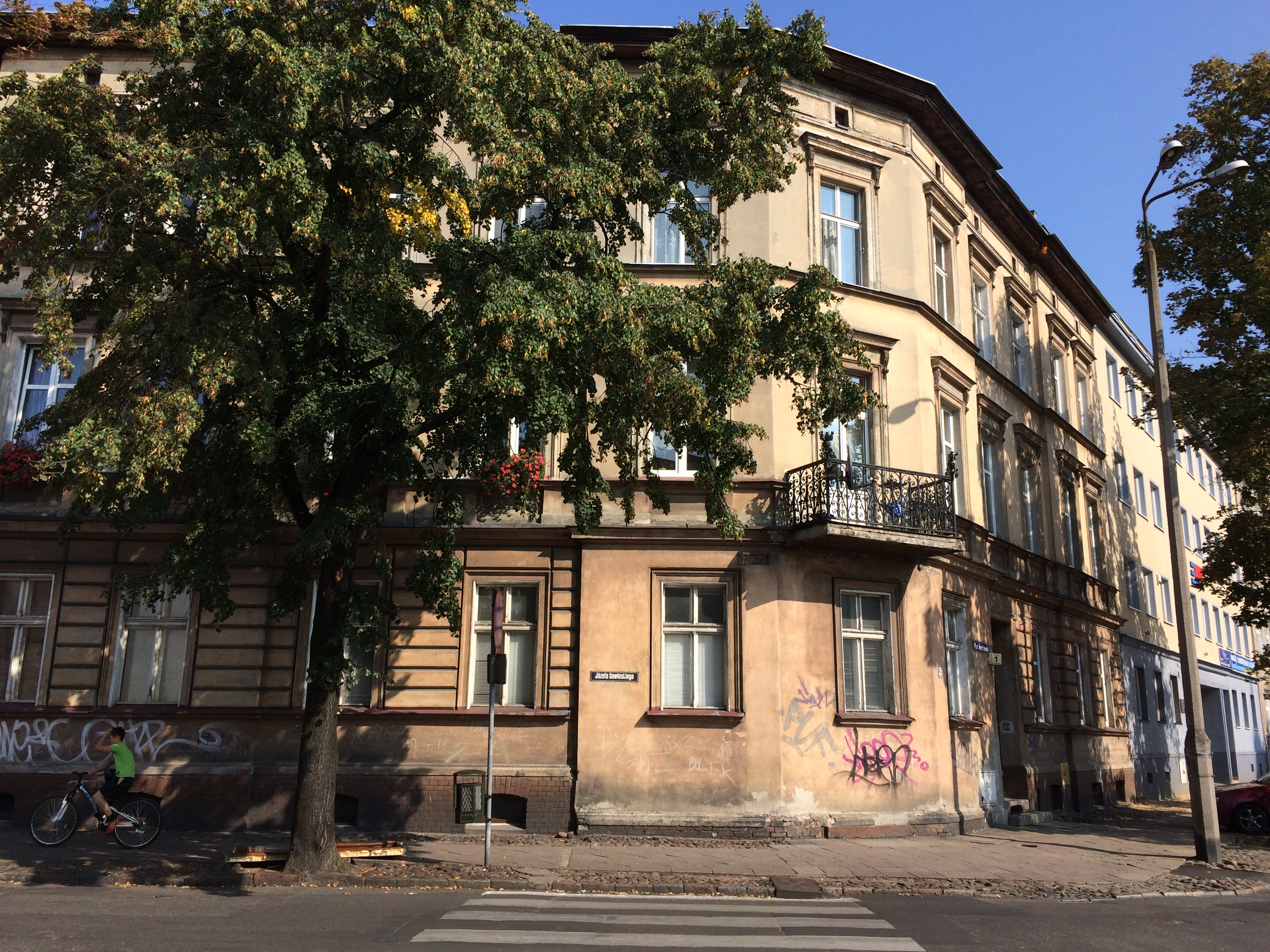
Main elevation from the square

=== Tenement at 2 ===
1872

Neoclassical architecture

The first landlord who lived at originally 11 Elisabeth Markt, in the 1890s, was Auguste Raabe, having business in shipping till the end of World War I.

The edifice, unfortunately, lost all its neo-classical features with time. A recent renovation occurred in the late 2010s.

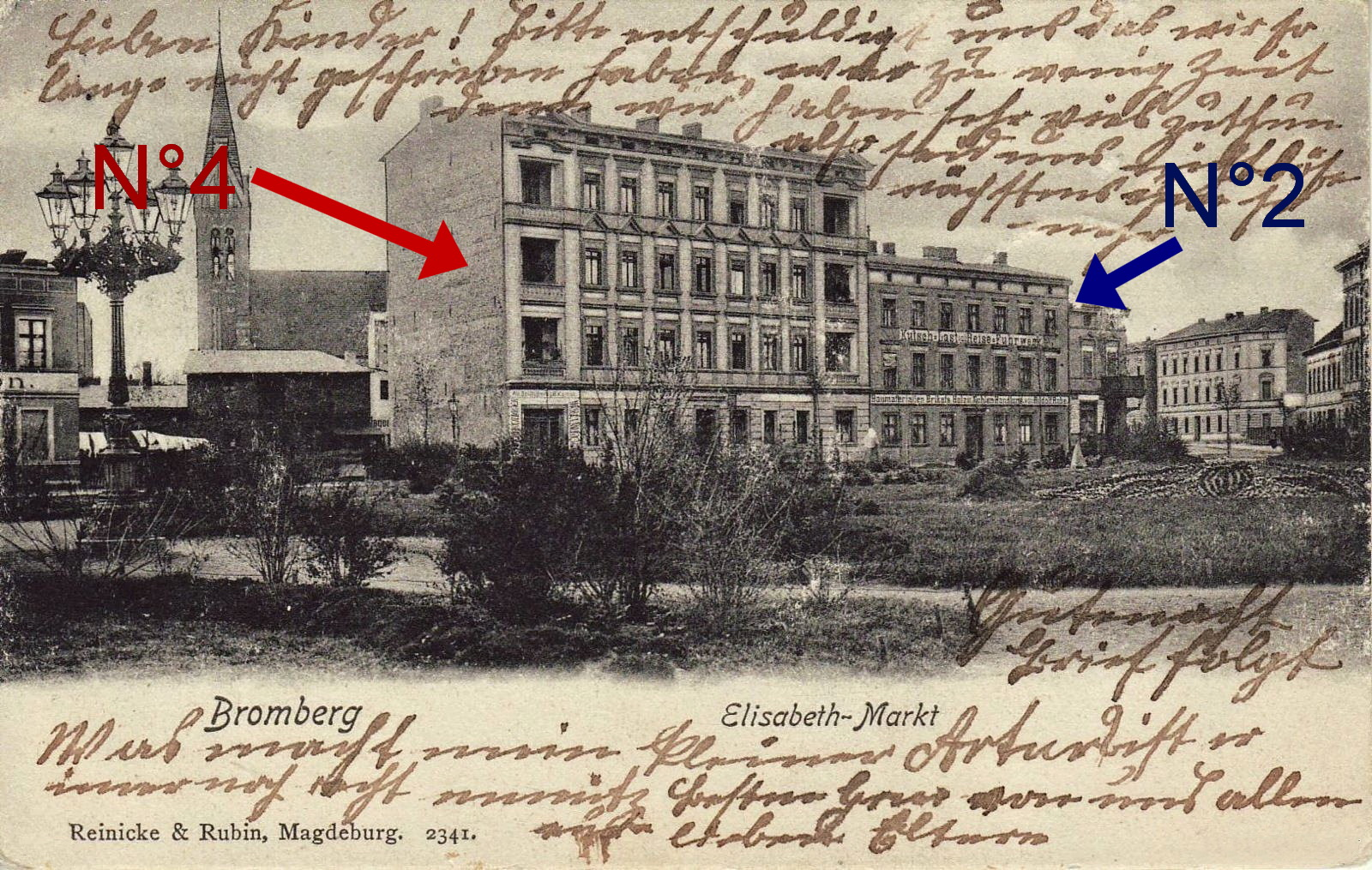
View of Nr.2 and 4 in 1900

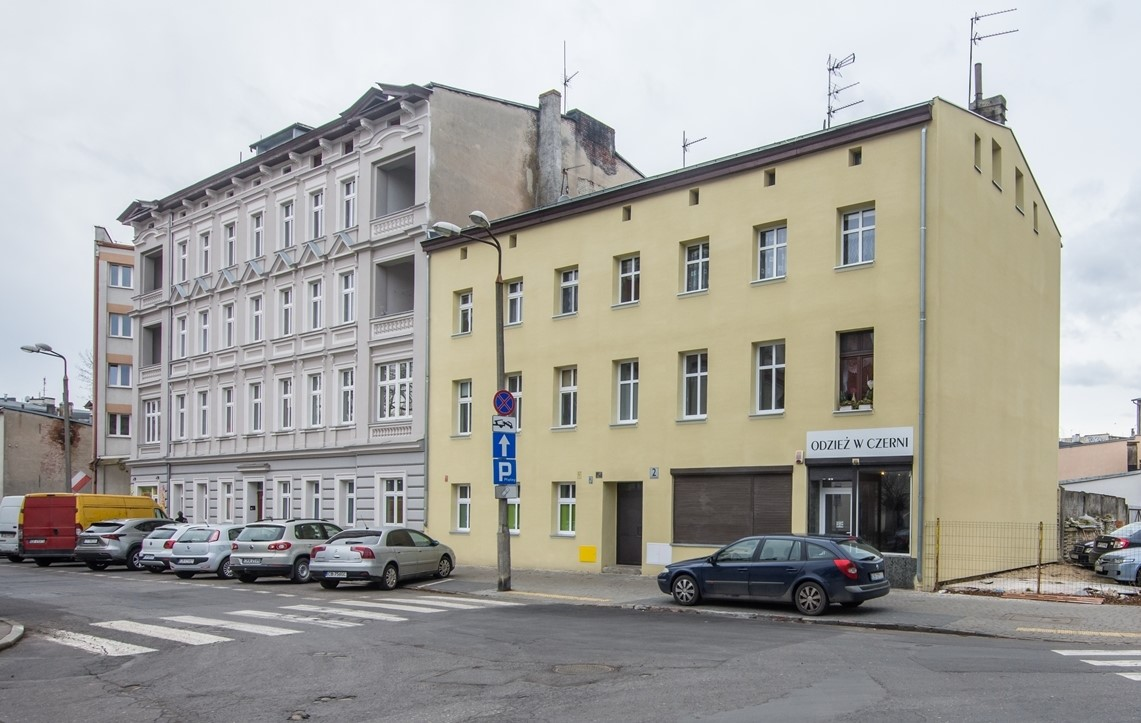
N2 and N4 after renovation

=== Tenement at 3 ===
1878, rebuilt by Jan Kossowski (1939)

Eclecticism

Original address was 9 Elisabeth Markt, it has been ordered by Julius Gendal, who then moved to Nr.4.

Today the elevation displays a modern style, as a consequence of the rebuilding by Jan Kossowski, who also realized in Bydgoszcz, among others the Freedom Monument and houses at 5 Ossoliński Alley and 7 Plac Wolności.

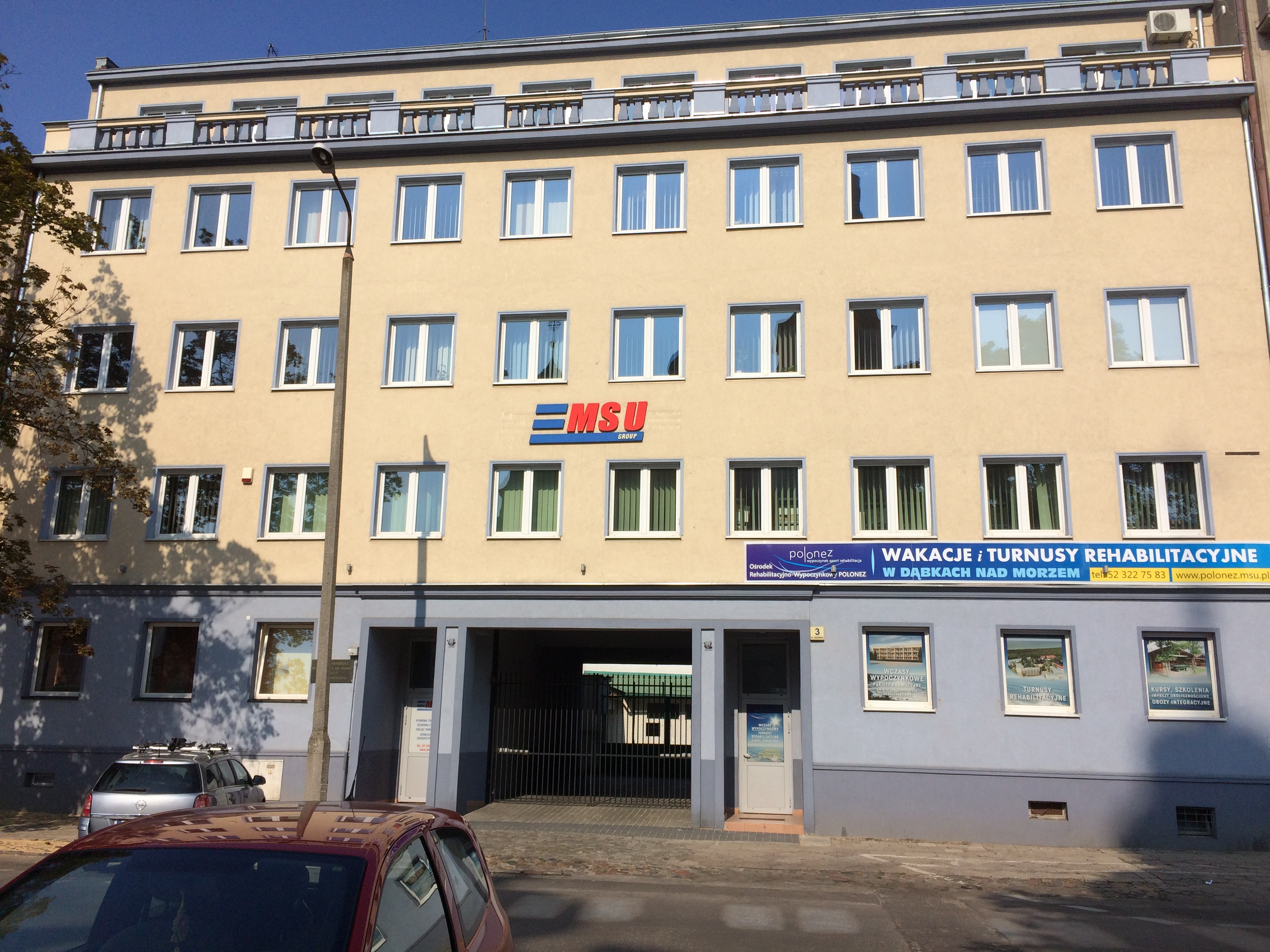
Current facade on the square

=== Tenement at 4 ===
1895-1896

Eclecticism

Original address was 12 Elisabeth Markt: its first owner was a wood manufacturer, Julius Gendal.

The main elevation displays its original architectural details, in contrast with Nr.2. Facade shows symmetric features, left and right of the main gate, especially stacked balustrade areas, either balcony or loggias on both extremities.

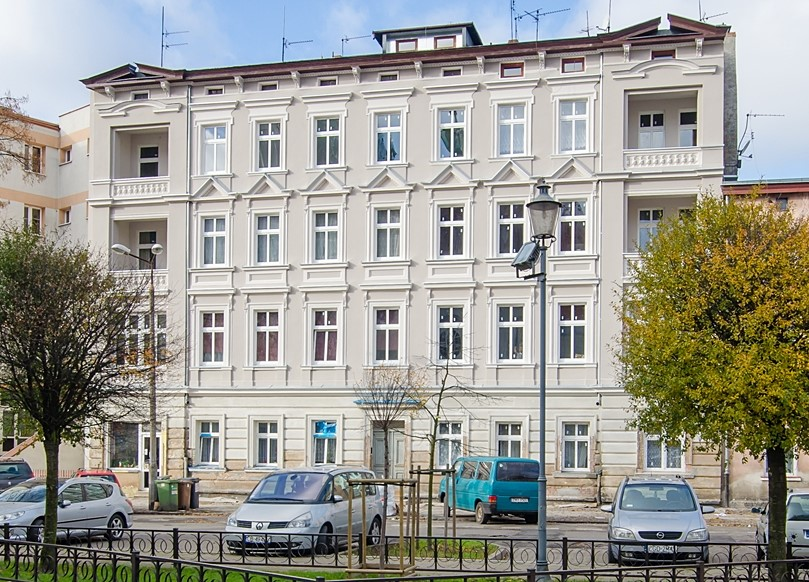
Main elevation

=== Church of the Sacred Heart of Jesus, at 5 ===
Registered on Kuyavian-Pomeranian Voivodeship heritage list, Nr.601221, Reg.A/746, December 12, 1971

1913, by Oskar Hoßfeld

Neo-Baroque

The church has been consecrated by Wilhelm Kloske, Gniezno's suffragan bishop on June 19, 1913. Initially, it was reserved for the use of German Catholics, but was opened to both communities, German and Polish, on February 17, 1924.

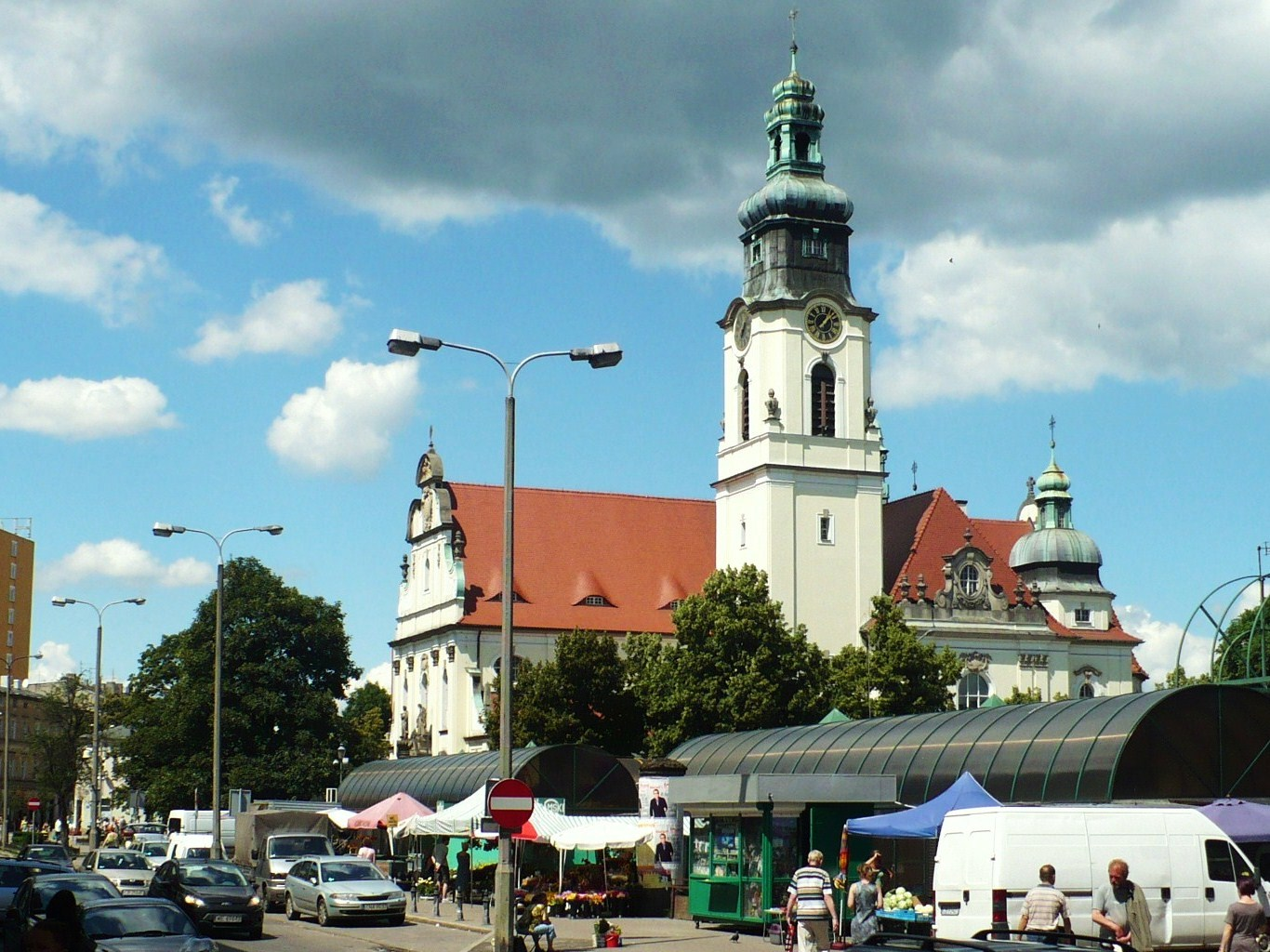
View from the square

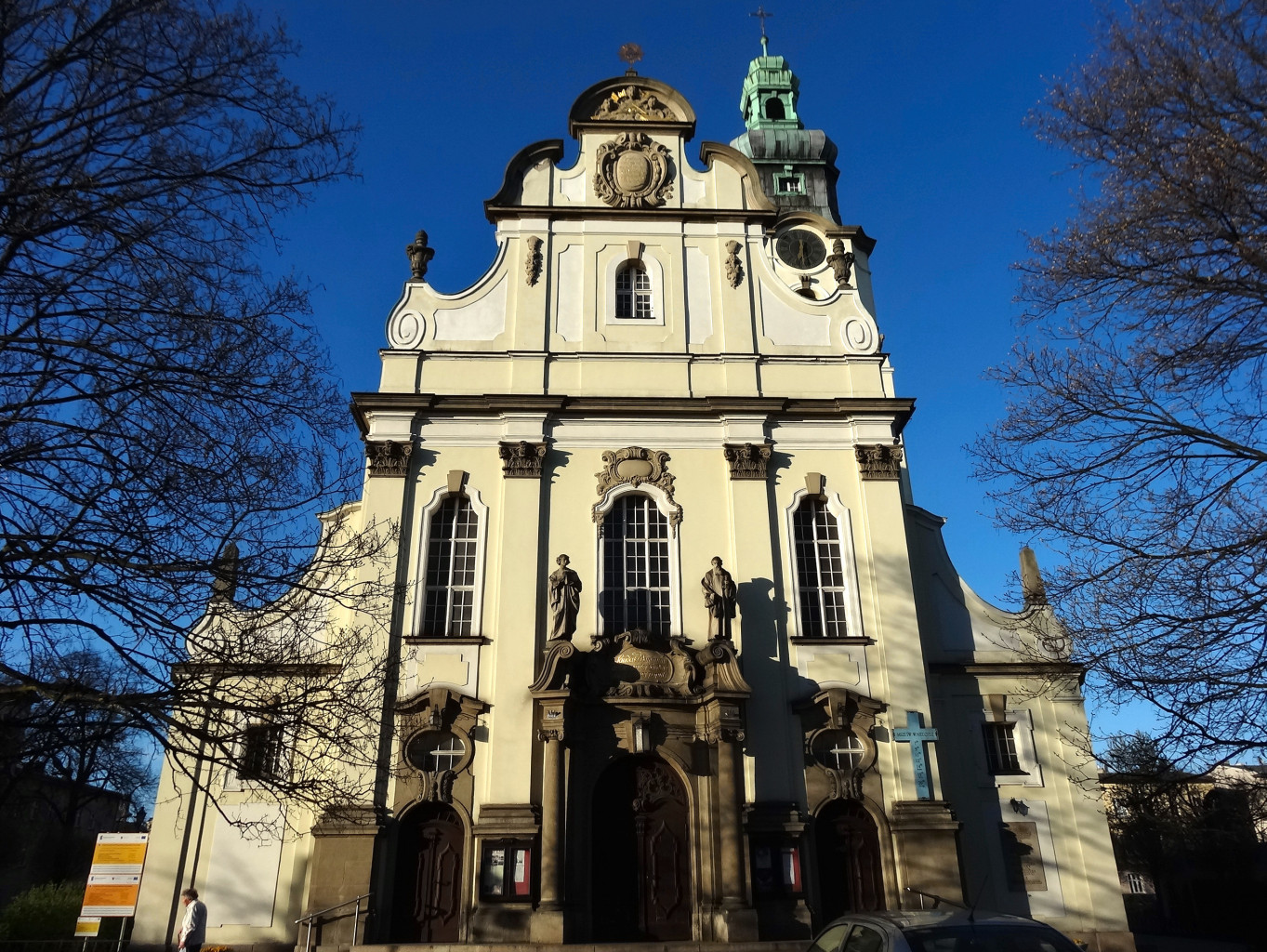
Main facade

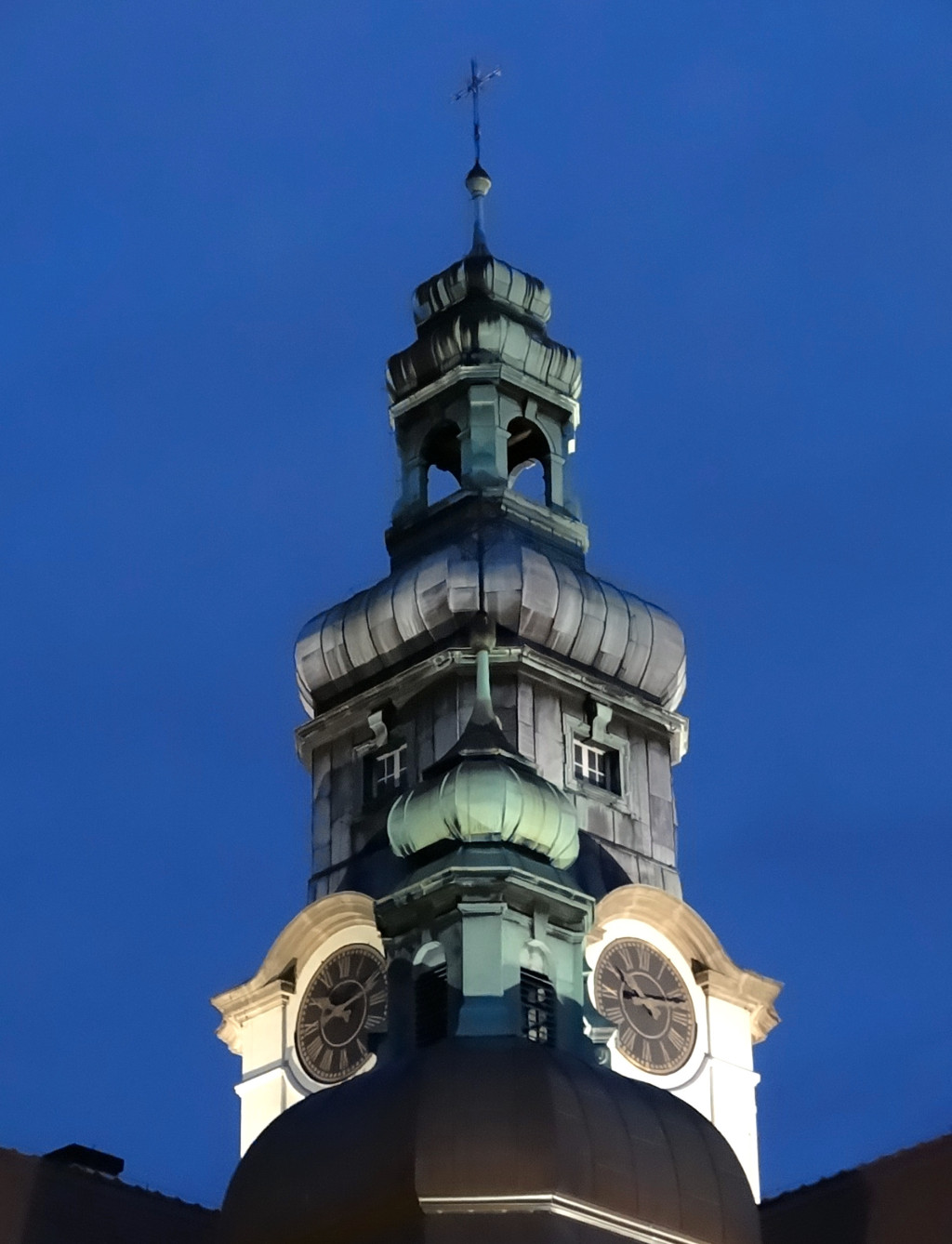
Church steeple

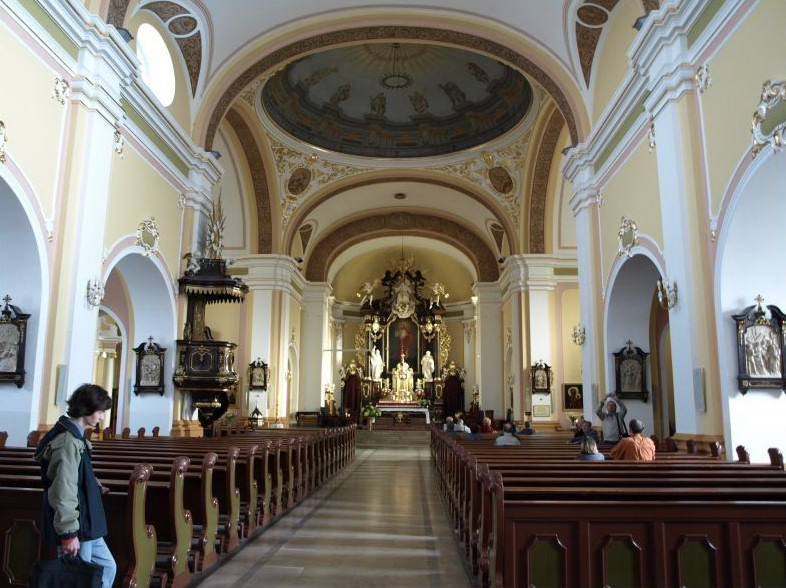
Church nave

=== Tenement at 7 ===
1875-1876

Eclecticism

First address was 7 Elisabeth Markt, first owner was Carl Teschner, merchant, then member of the city council, co-owner of a brick factory, "Carl Teschner und Wilehlm Vincent" on Allee straße (today Ulica Stroma).

Although deprived from some architectural details, one can still appreciate the symmetric facade centered on the two balconies, the first floor windows with pediments, cartouches, balustrade, and the top thin frieze with floral motifs.

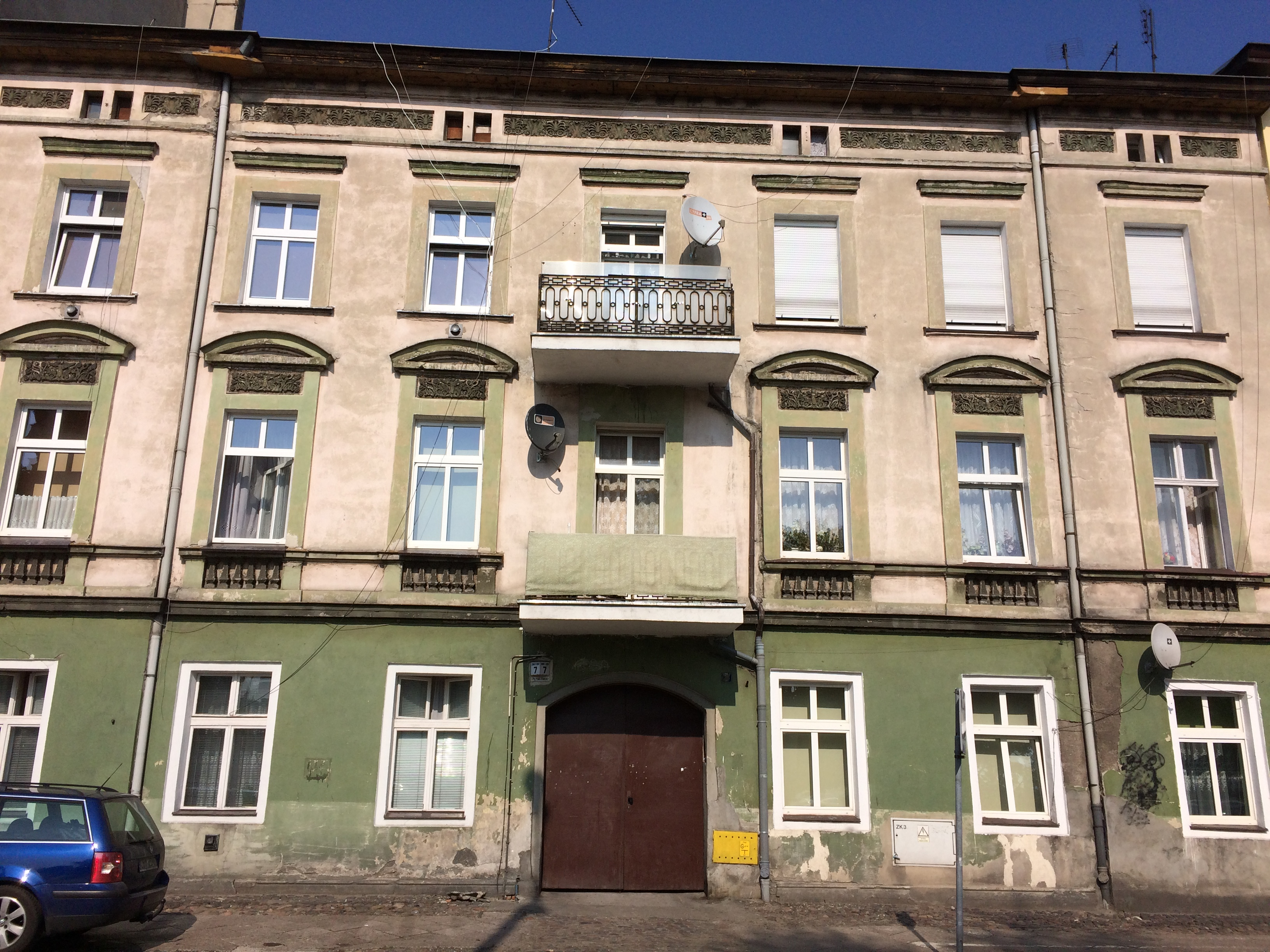
View of the main elevation from the square

=== Tenement at 9 ===
1884-1885

Eclecticism

First address was 6a Elisabeth Markt, first owner was August Kopplow, an administrative assistant.

The main elevation lost most of its architectural features, albeit it has been renovated in 2017.

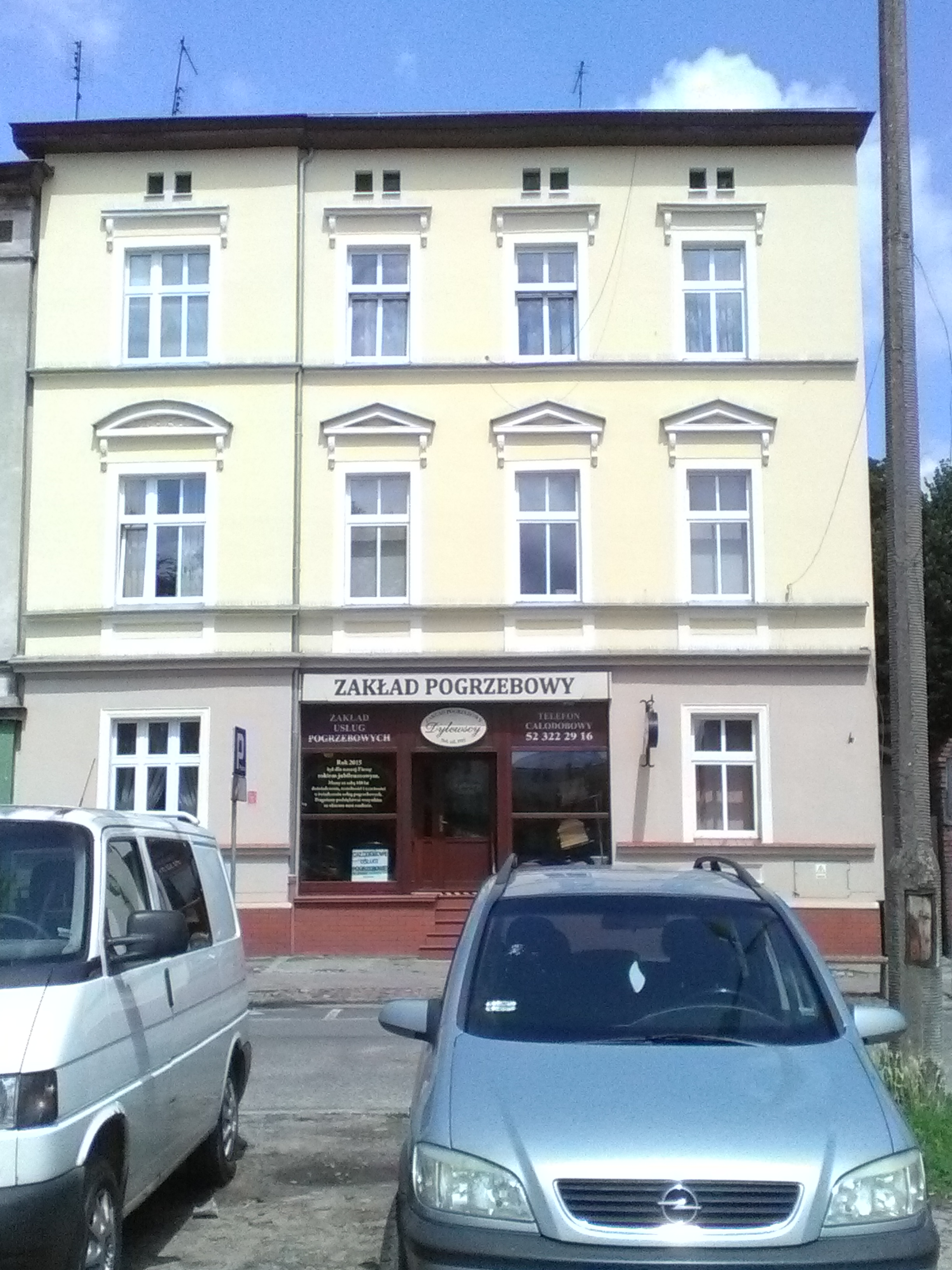
Main frontage

=== Tenement at 11, corner with Wileńska Street ===
1886-1887

Eclecticism

First address was 6 Elisabeth Markt, the first owner being a rentier, Fritz Dörnbrack, who lived at 11 Elisabeth Straße, now 37 Śniadecki Street .

The elevation, recently refurbished (2016), shows evident Neo-Classicist features. Symmetry of both facades, plain pedimented windows and carved cartouches with children figures. The main gate is flanked by two lean columns.

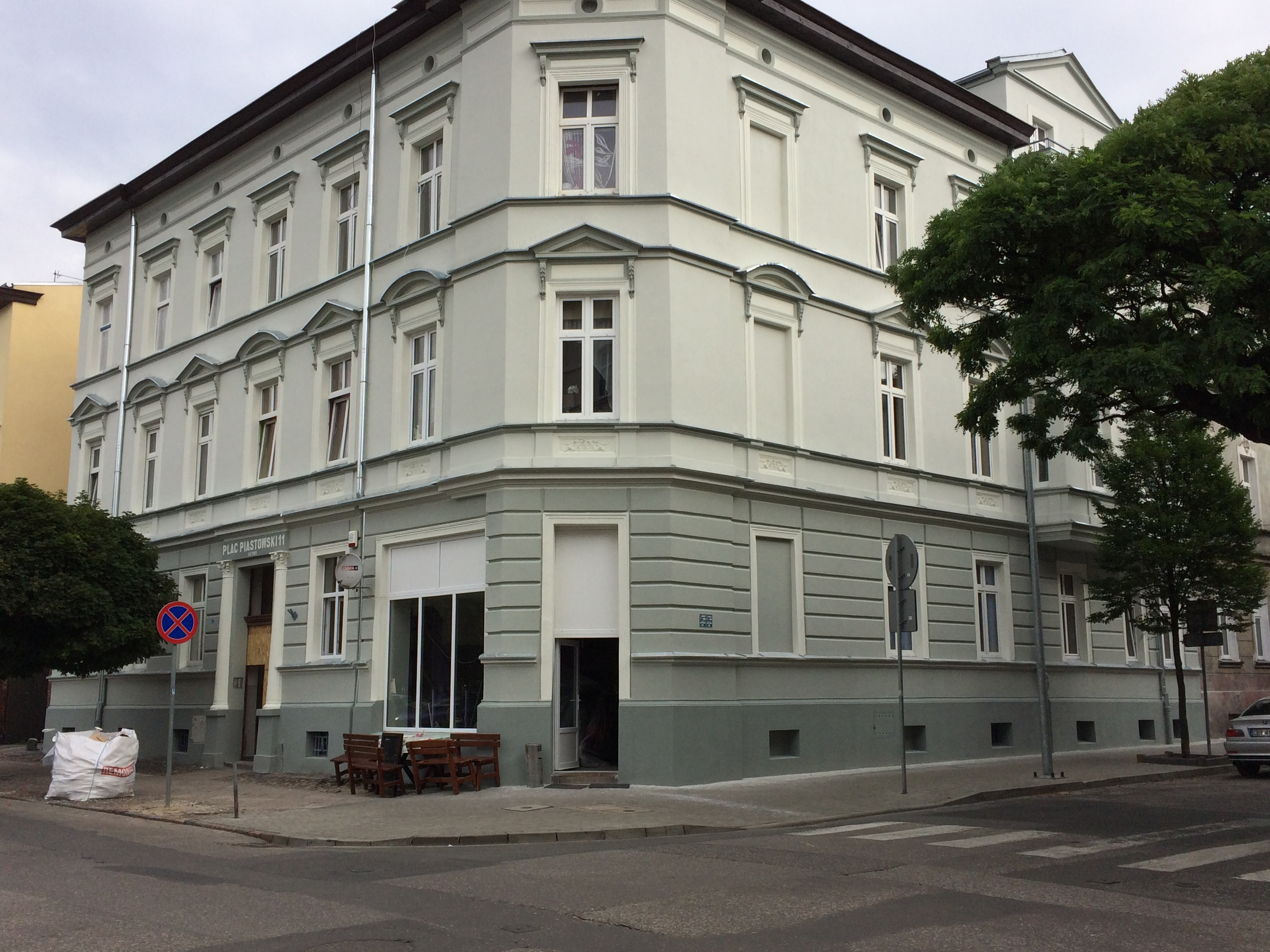
Corner view

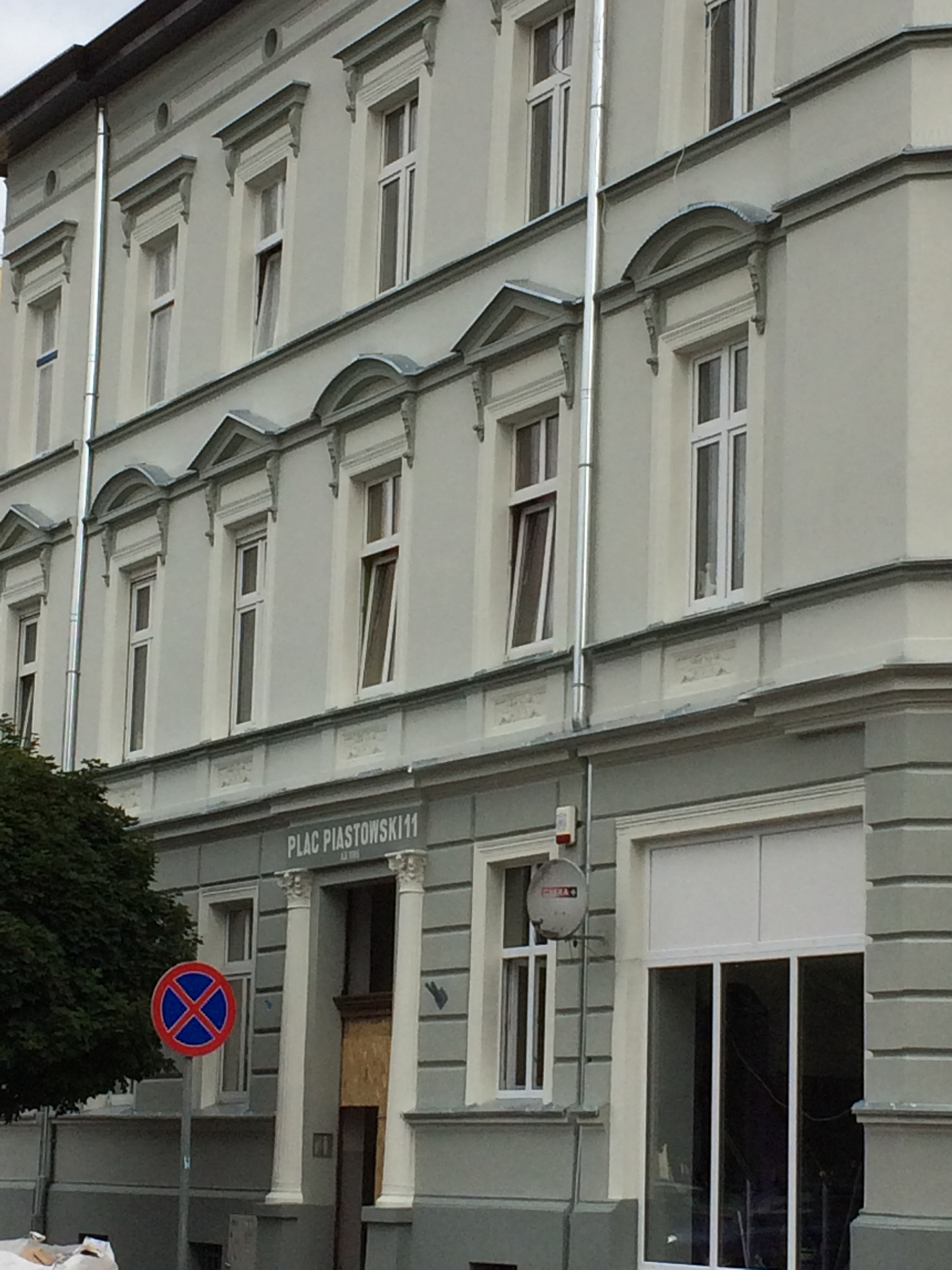
Facade on the square

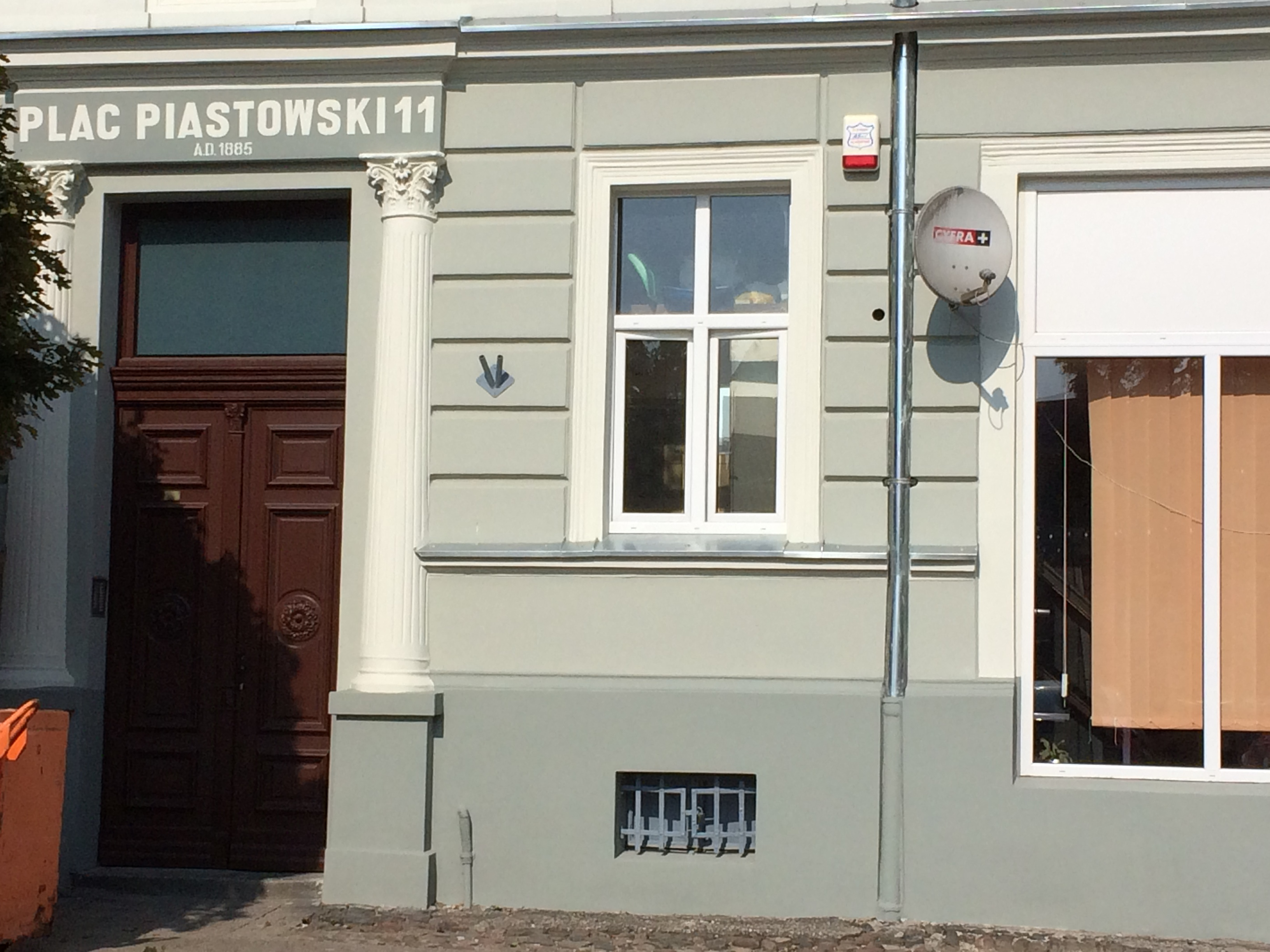
Detail of the main gate

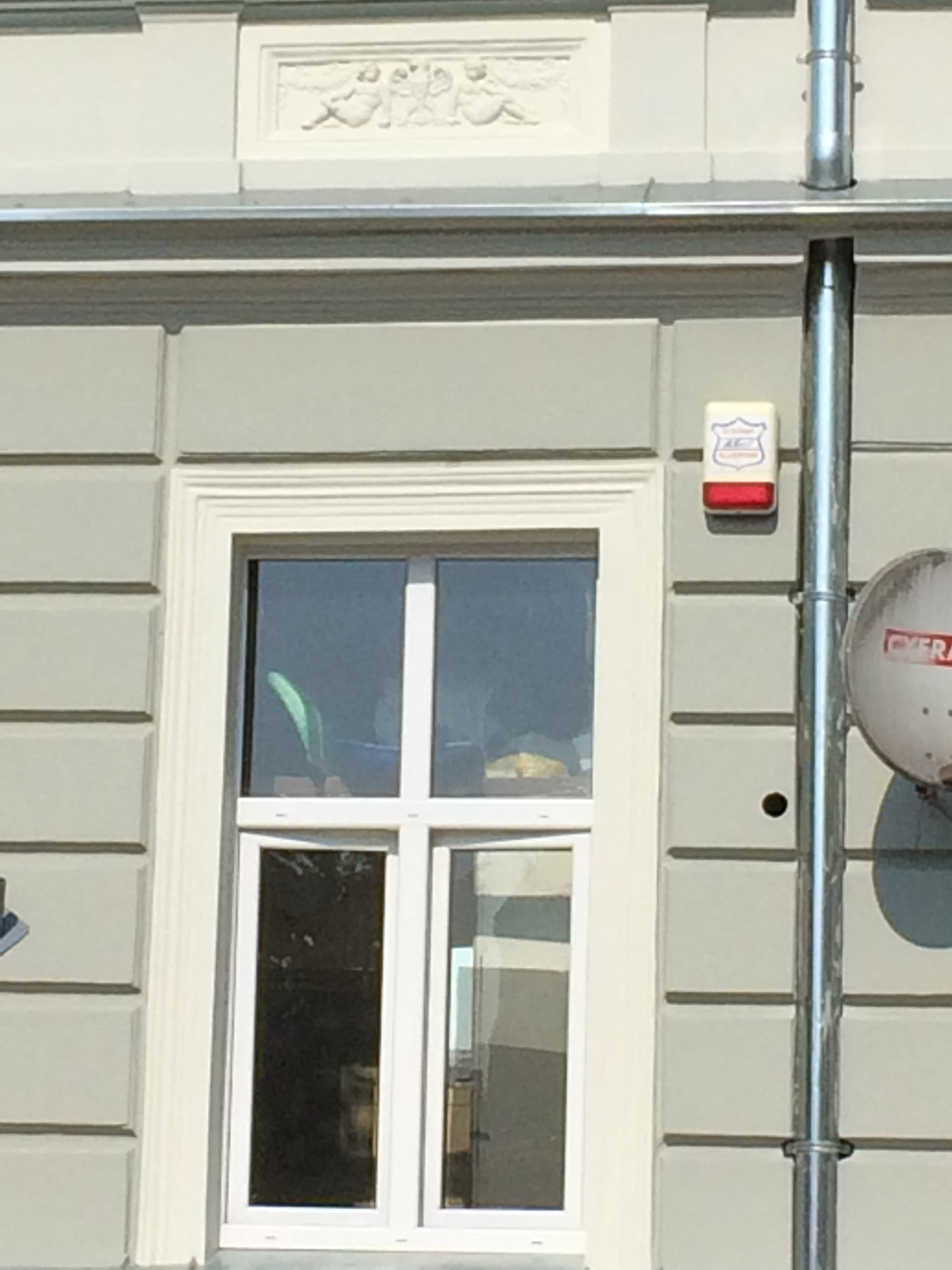
Detail of a window cartouche
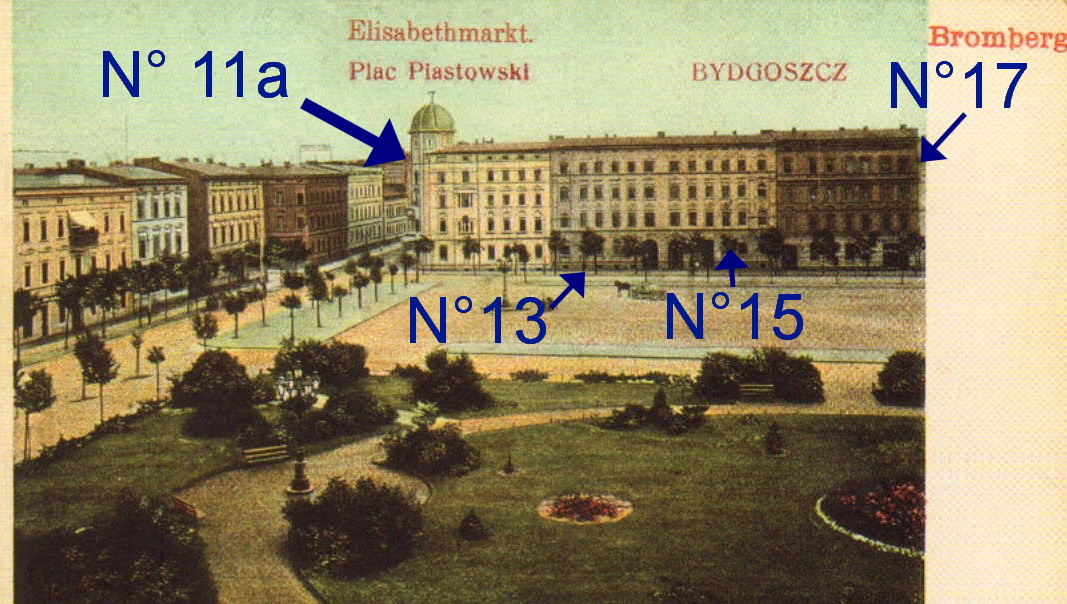
East side frontages (Nr.11a to 17) ca 1912

=== Tenement at Nr.11a, corner with 23 Chrobrego Street ===
1902-1903

Eclecticism

First address was 5 Elisabeth Markt, the first owner was a rentier, Arthur ßaulini, who resided at neighbouring Nr.4 (now Nr.13). In 1910, the edifice moved to the hands of Carl Rose, a famous architect in Bromberg living on 29 Danzigerstraße.

The renovated corner house displays several architectural details, characteristic of Eclecticism. One can underline in particular:

- the corner tower, with a large balustrade-corbel featured balcony, topped by a tented roof cupola;
- bay windows on each facade, with loggias, columns and a pediment showing a floral decorated tympanum;
- round pediments on the first floor, with floral ornament.
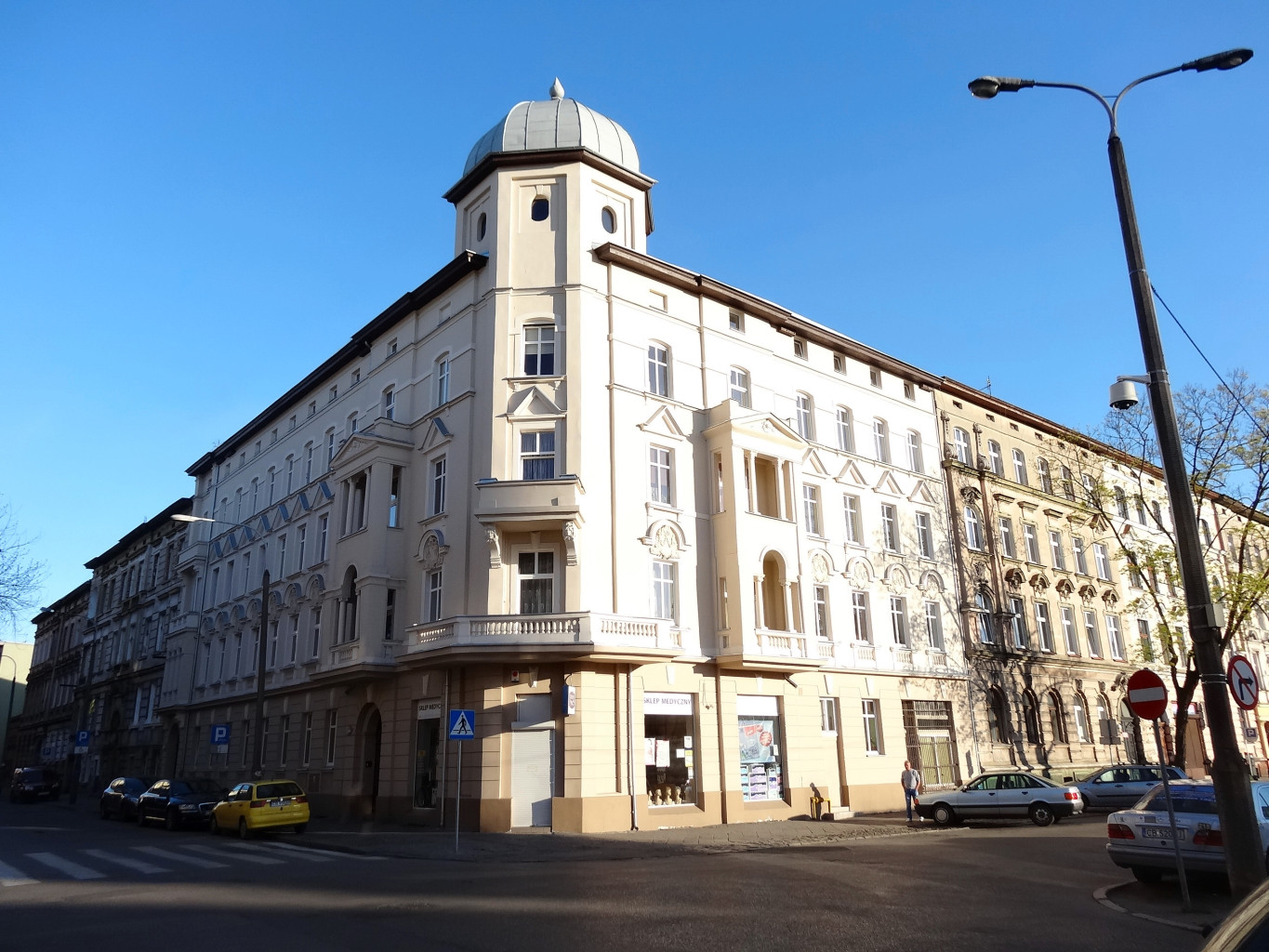
Corner view

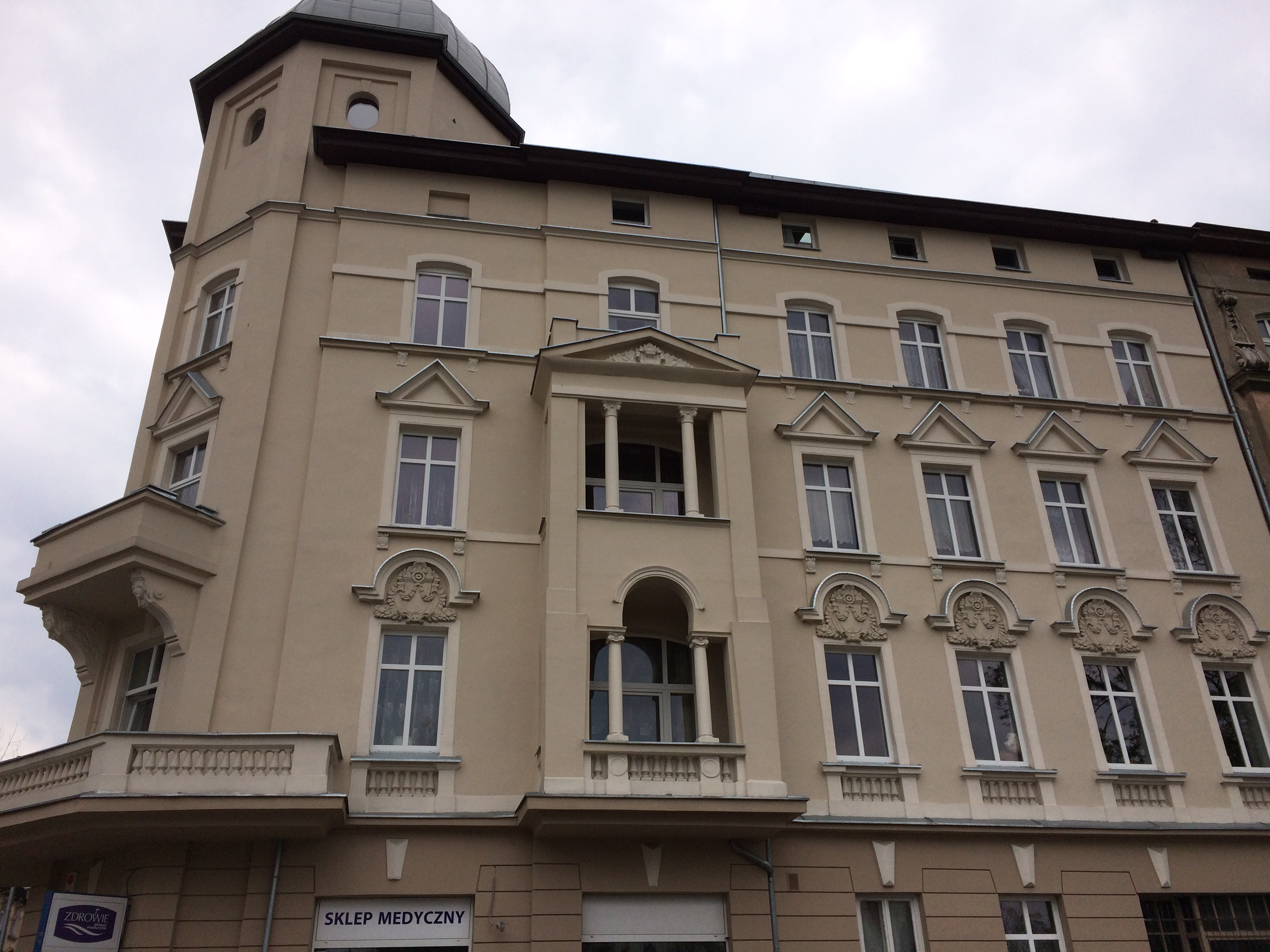
View from the square

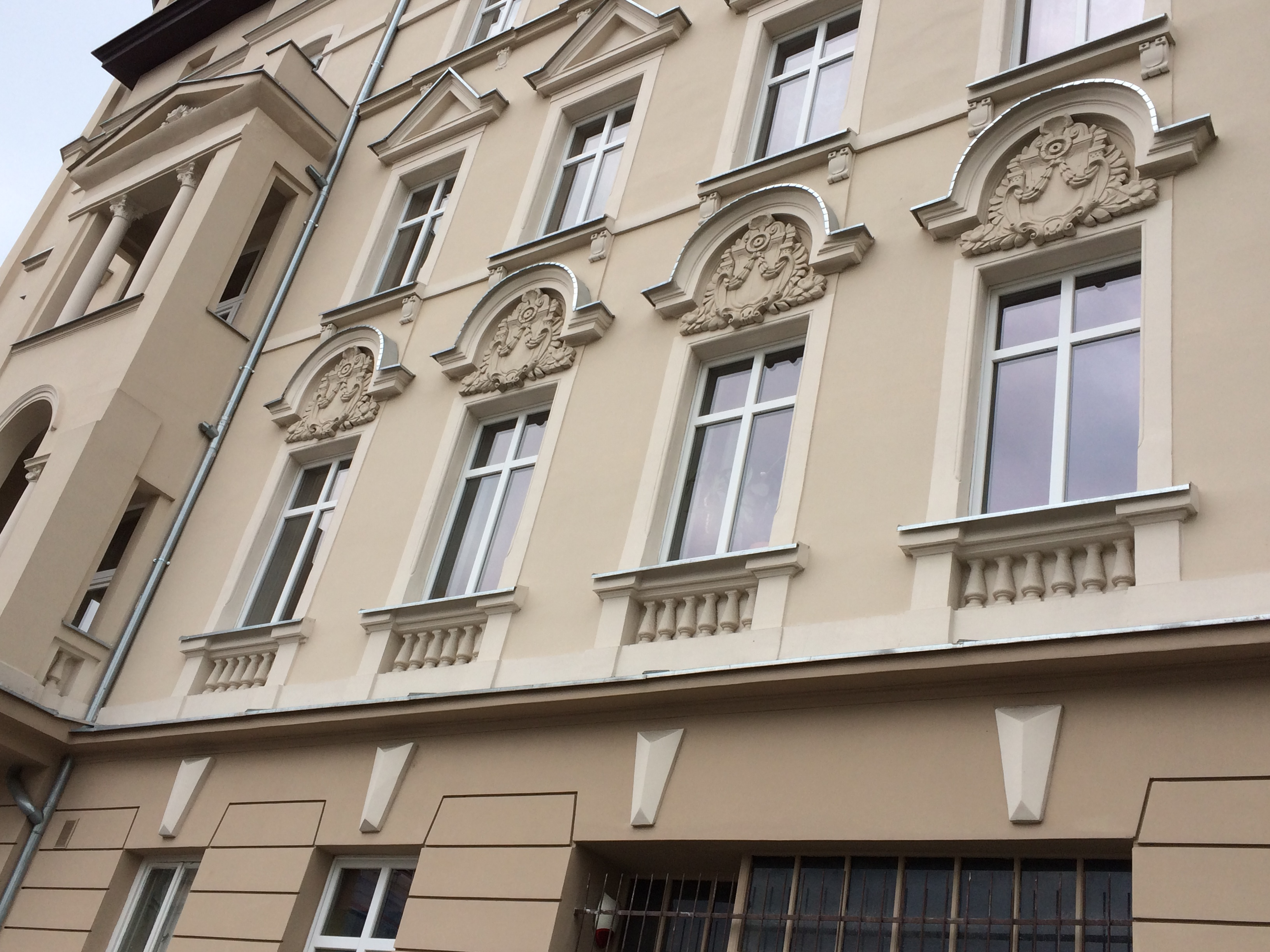
Detailed view from the square

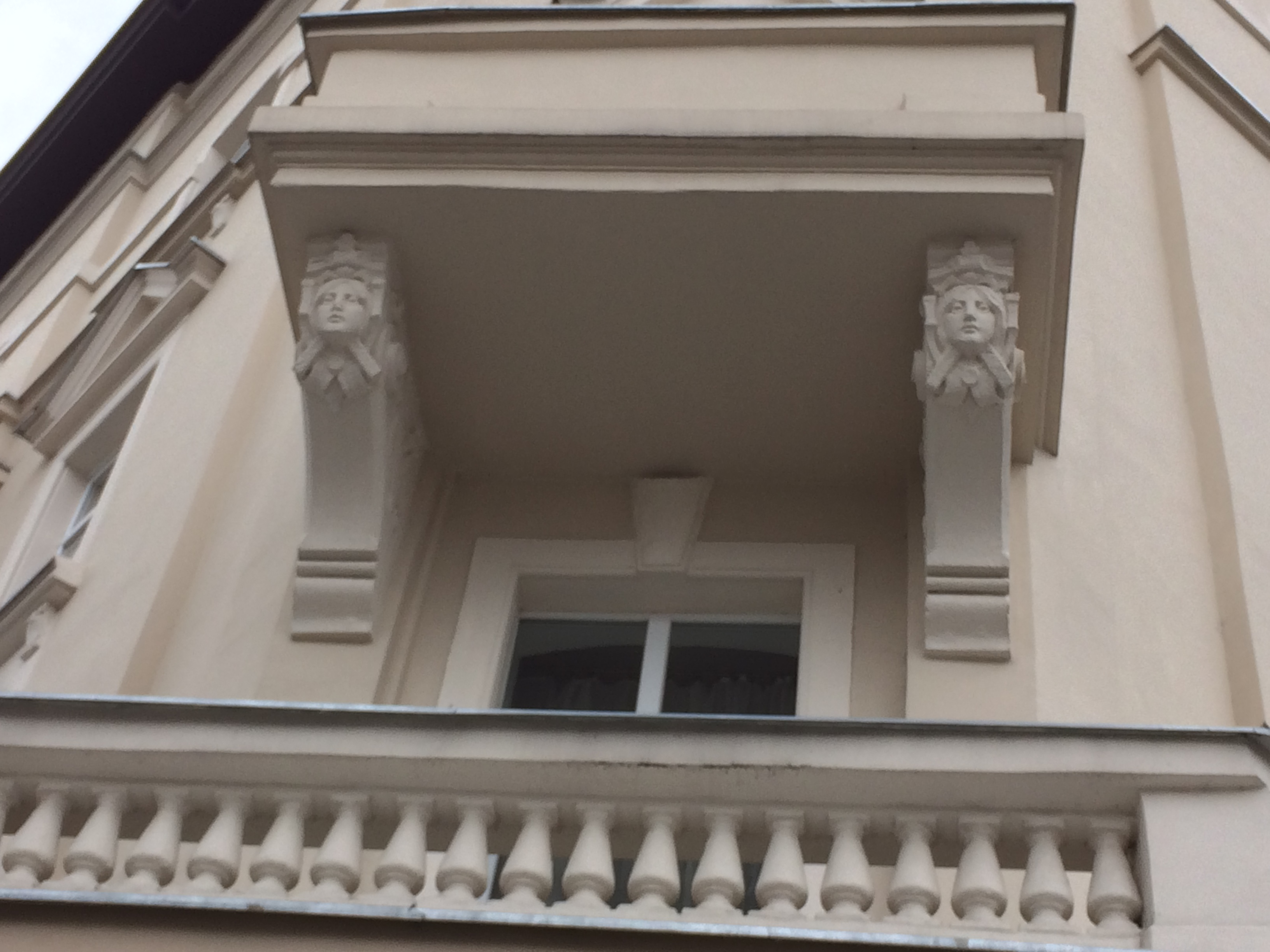
Detail of the balcony

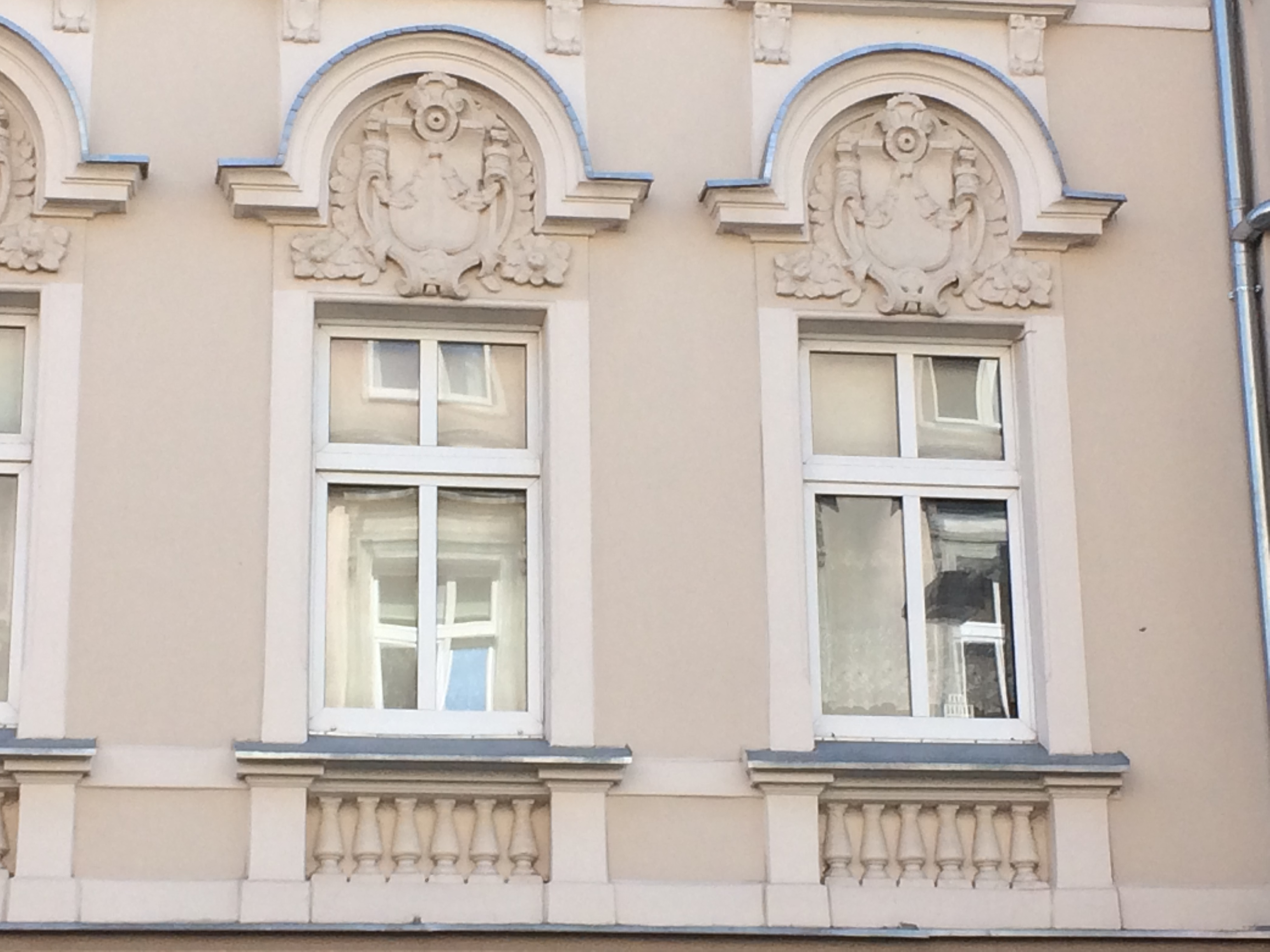
Detail of a window balustrade and pediment

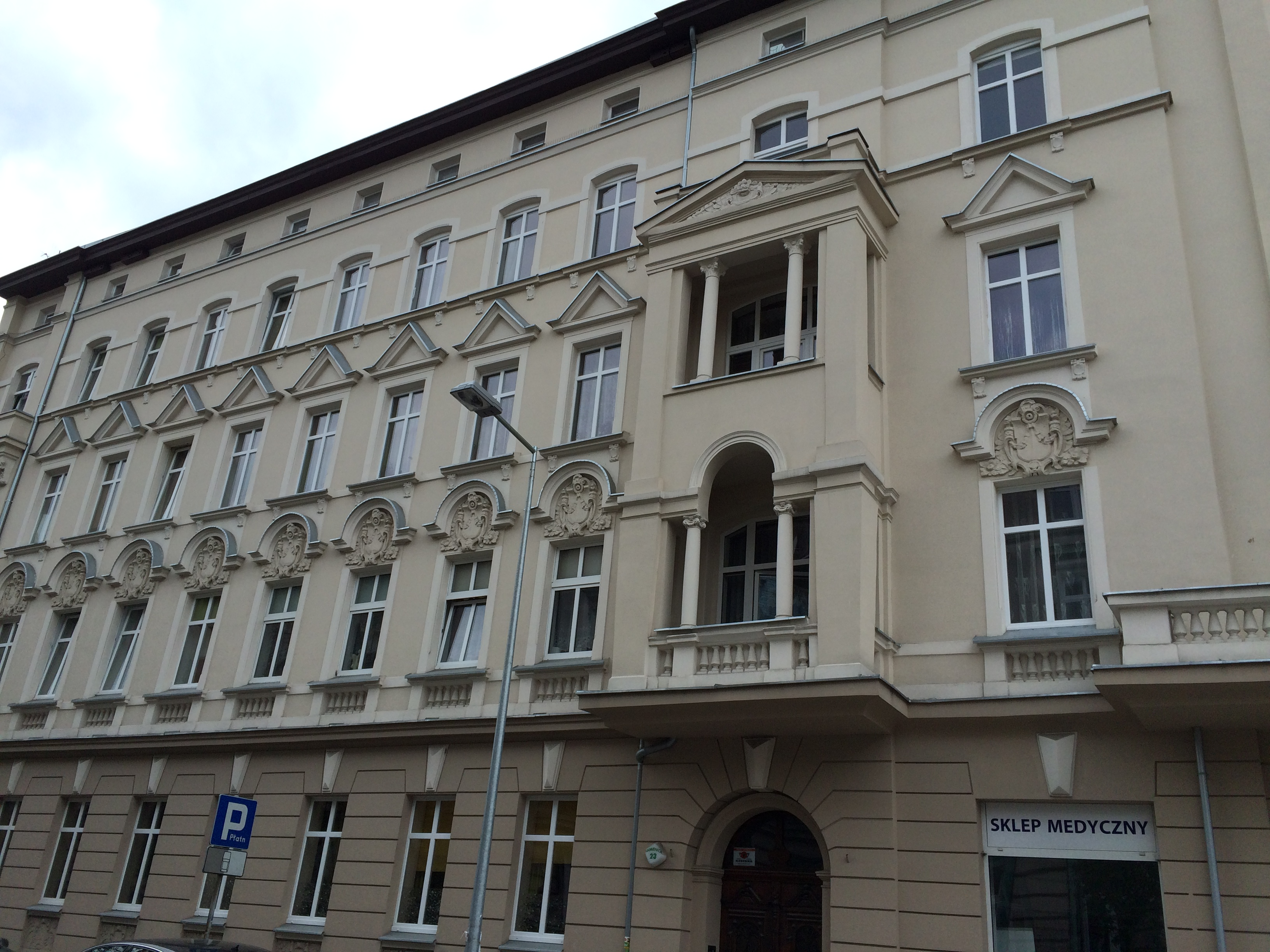
Facade on Chrobrego Street

=== Tenements at Nr.13/17 ===
1893-1894 (Nr.13)

1894-1895 (Nr.15) and 1895-1896 (Nr.17) by Karl Bergner

Eclecticism

These buildings were located at respectively Nr.4, 3 and 2 of Elisabeth Markt. First owners were:

- August Günther (Nr.13 and 15), a wood trader, living at Nr.13. He had also commissioned the tenement at nearby 21 Chrobrego Street;

- Adolf Röhr (Nr.17) a restaurateur, who ran his business at the same address. Today, the place still houses a restaurant.

The architect Karl Bergner realized these buildings with the same pattern in mind.

Nr.13 and 15 mirrored each other in perfect symmetry: only some ornamentation details differ. One can appreciate the large gates with a round glass transom light, crowned with a stylish motif and the pedimented first floor windows. Nr.13 facade retains bit more architectural details, such as additional head figures, and a left part of the elevation with richer decoration (pilasters, stucco ornaments).

Nr.17, renovated in 2016, breaks the symmetry, with thicker bossage lines on the ground level and the absence of architectural details present at Nr.13 and 15. Still noticeable is the main gate with a transom light, flanked by pilasters topped by floral and puttoes motif.

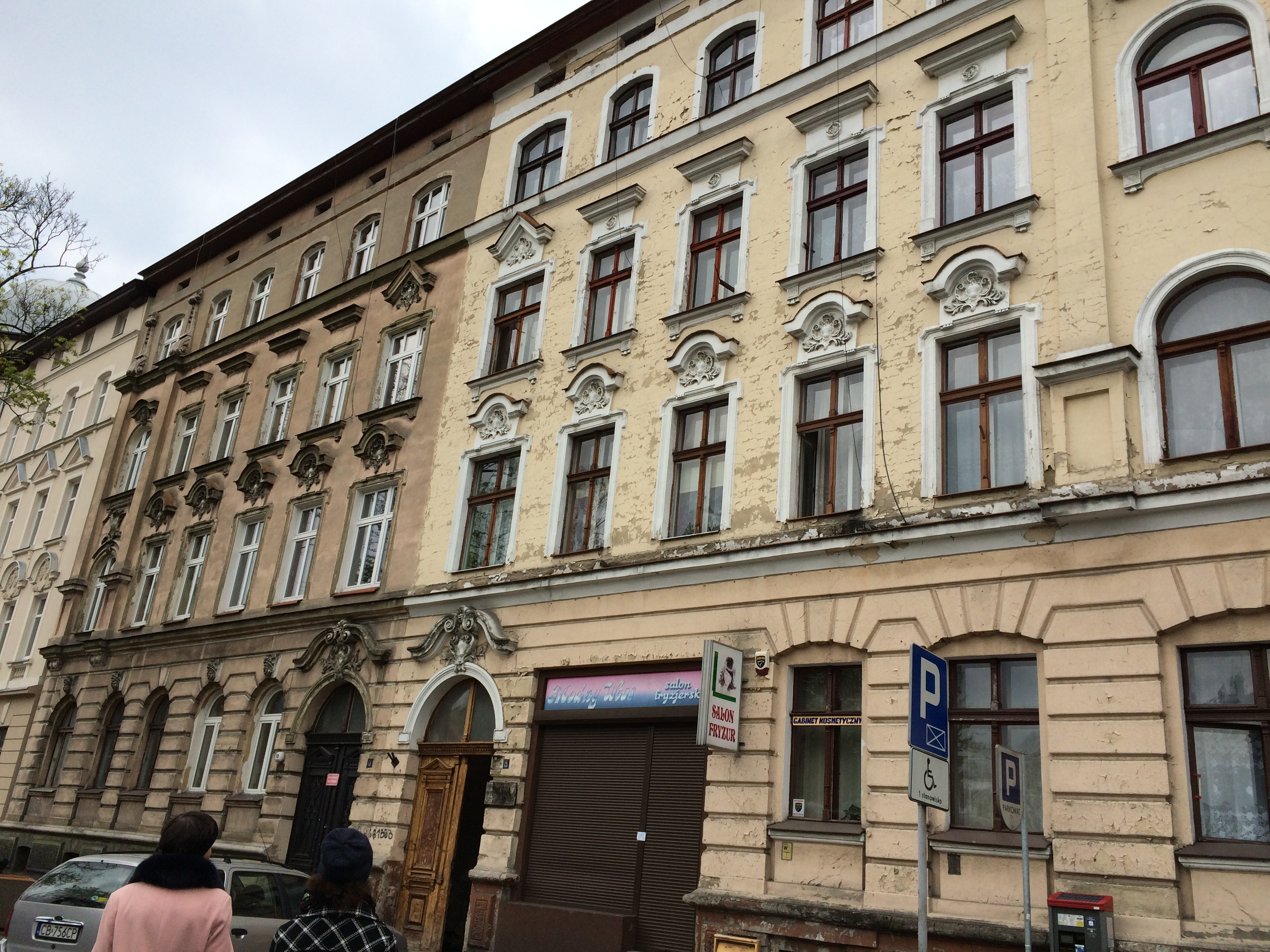
Facades of Nr.13 and 15

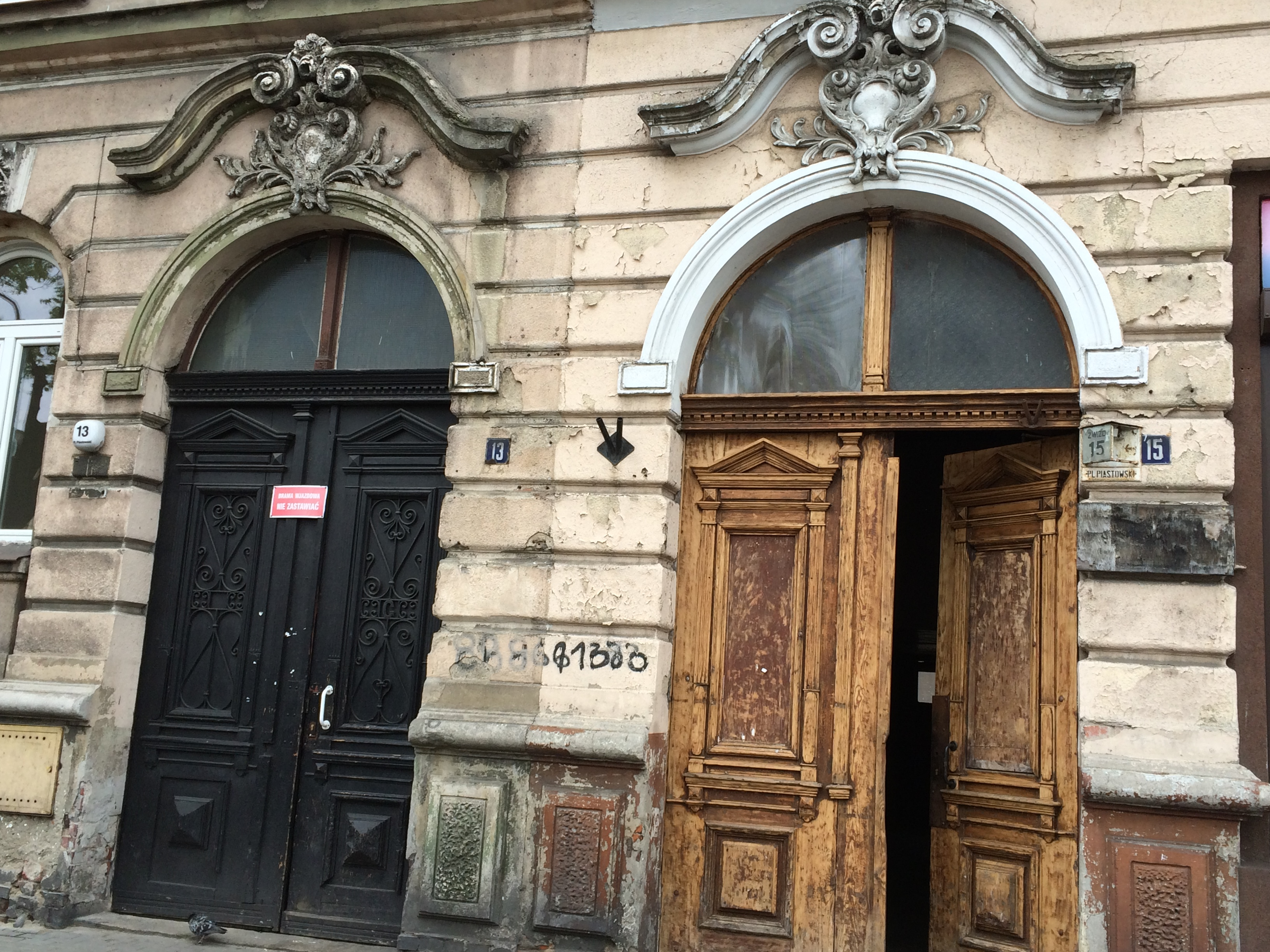
Main gates of Nr.13 and 15

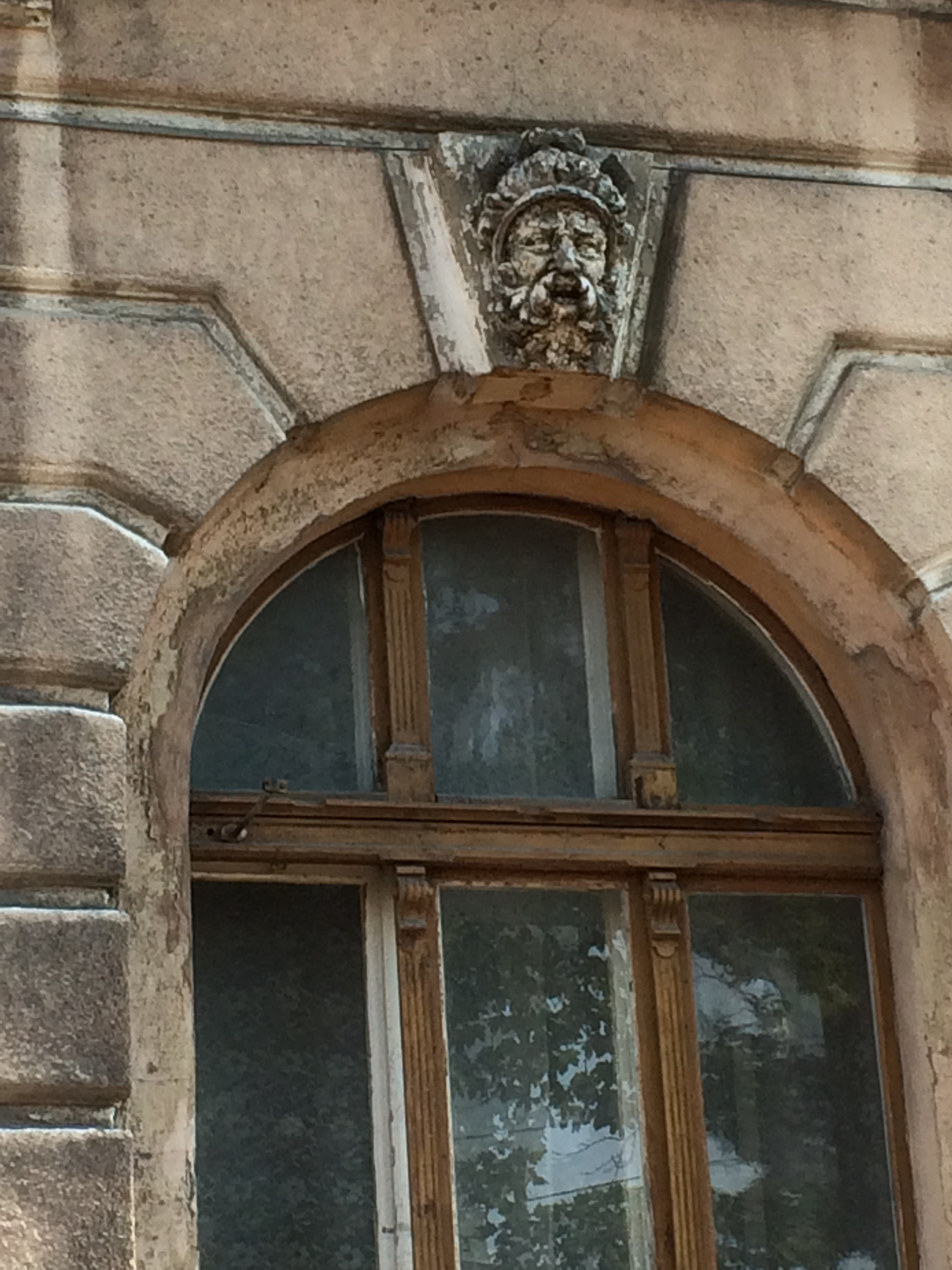
Detail at Nr.13

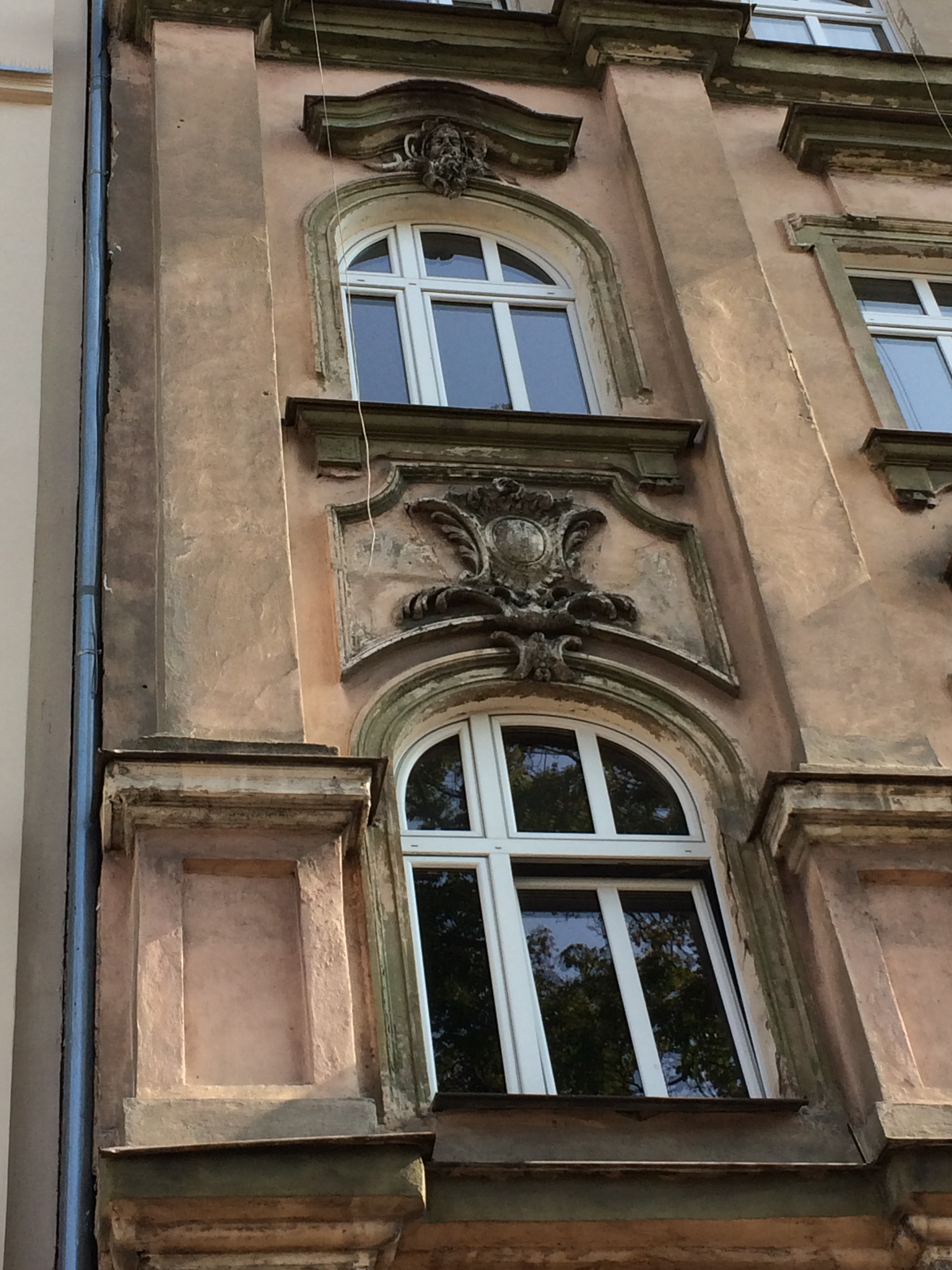
Nr.13, left part of the elevation

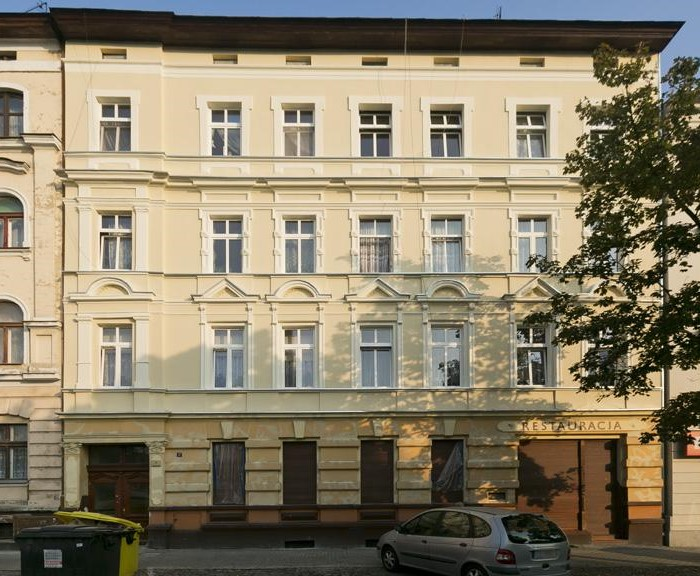
Main elevation of Nr.17

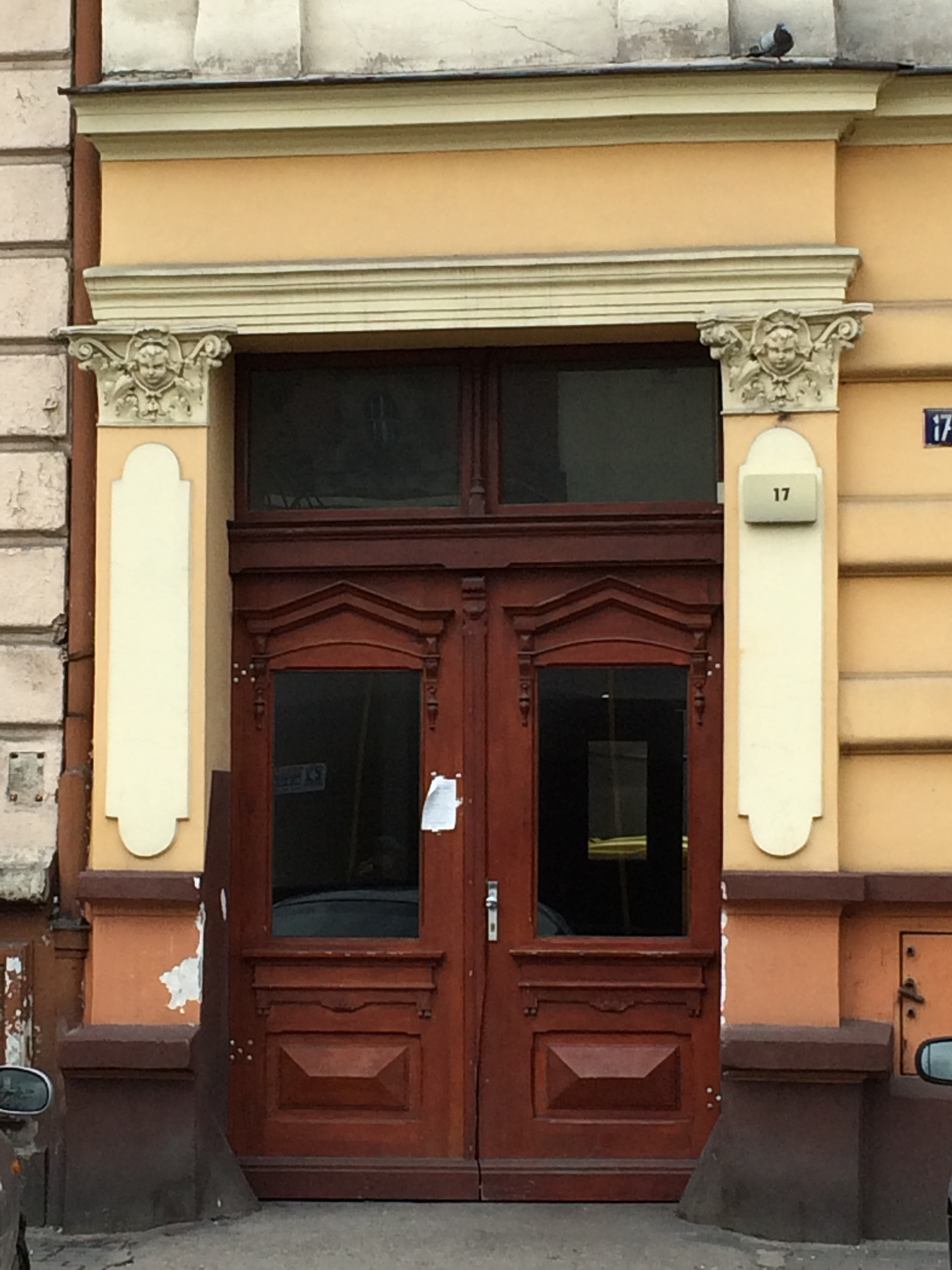
Main gate at Nr.17 before renovation

=== Tenement at Nr.19, corner with Śniadeckich Street ===
1875

Eclecticism, Neo-Renaissance

The building, then at Elisabeth Straße 39, was owned by a rentier, Carl Wilhelm Feyertag, living at "Bahnhoffstraße 11" (now 27 Dworcowa Street). He also owned the tenement at 57 Śniadecki Street.

Recently renovated, the elevation is remarkable by its wooden bay window capped by a tented roof, overhanging the corner. A long frieze runs on both frontages.

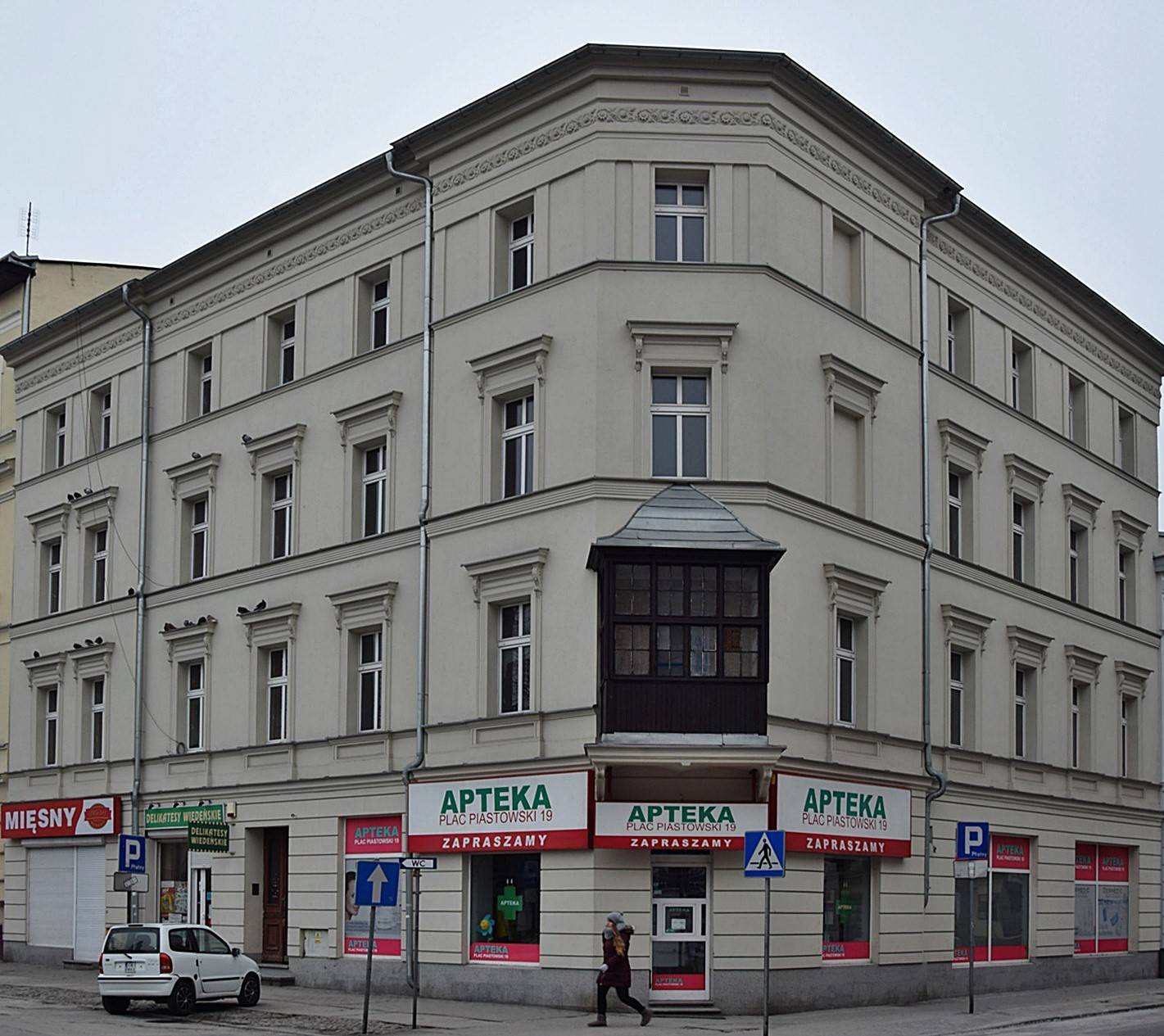
Corner view

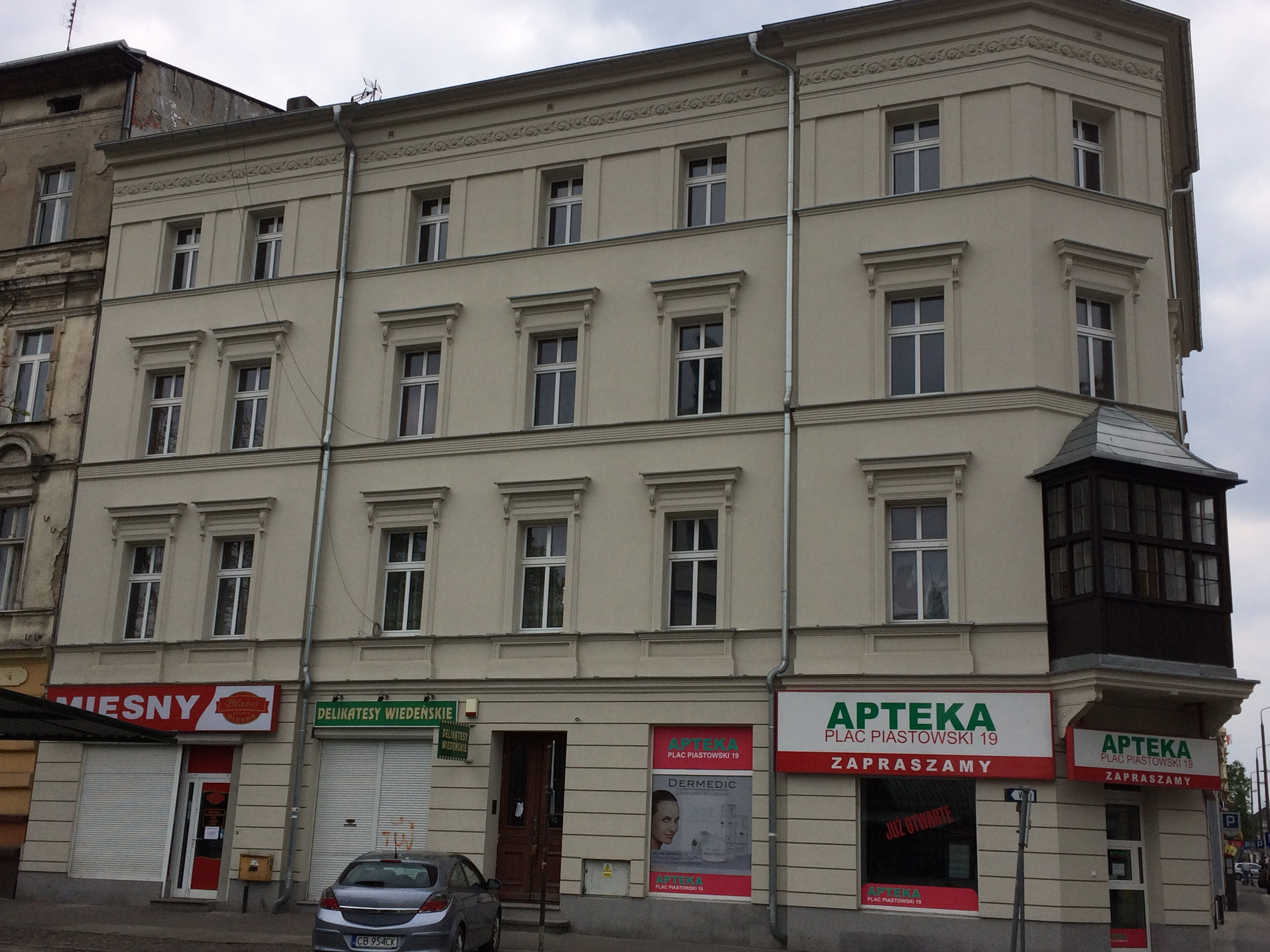
Renovated facade on the square

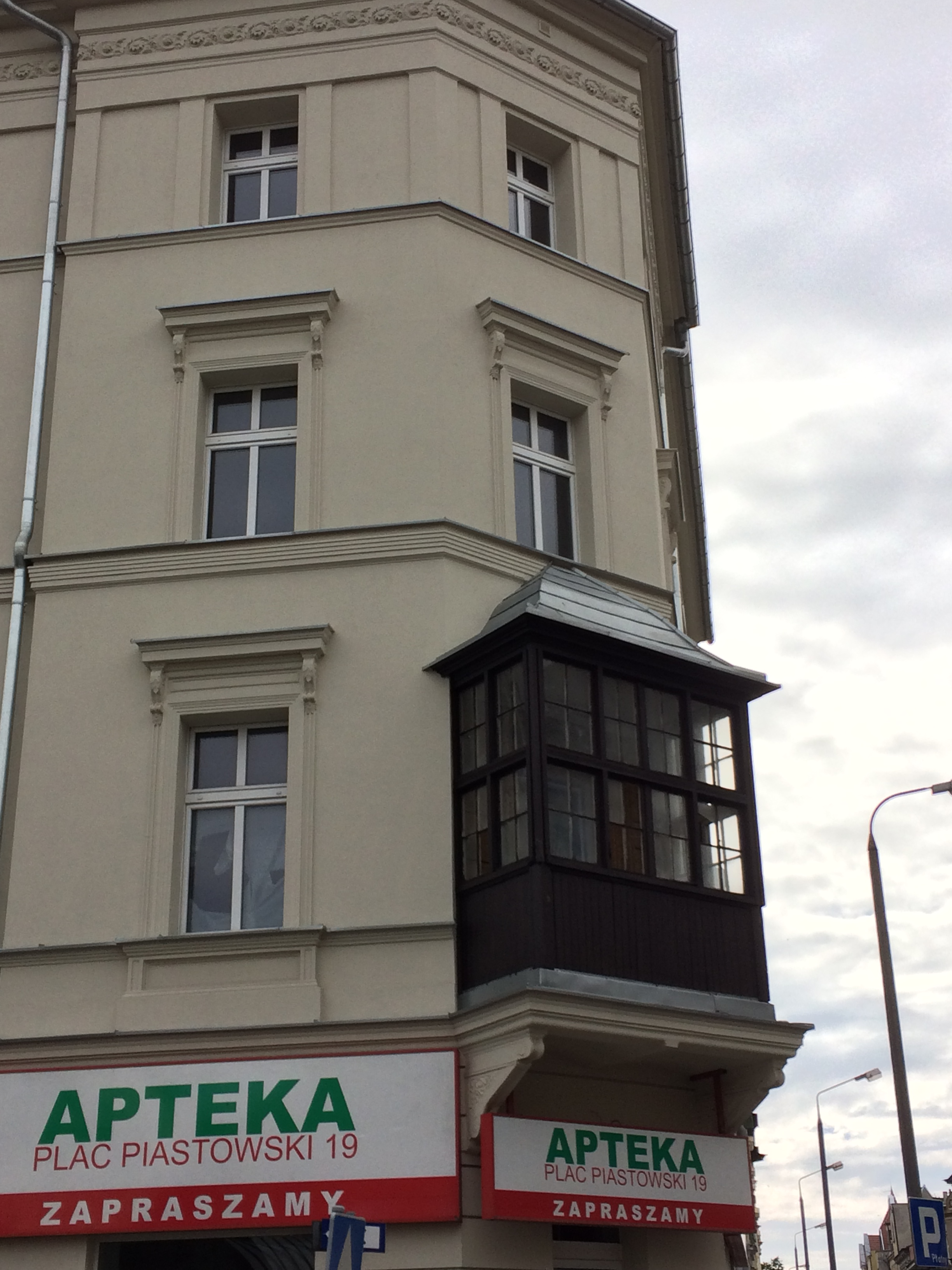
Bay window

=== Tenement at 45 Śniadeckich Street ===
Registered on Kuyavian-Pomeranian Voivodeship heritage list, Nr.A/1658, May 23, 2014

1896-1897

Eclecticism

The building, then at Elisabethstraße 23 was the property of Robert Winkler, a merchant, also landlord of Elisabethstraße 24 (Nr.47).

The building strikes by its original shape and its rich architectural decoration. The facade is asymmetrical, the only bay window is unbalanced, with quarter circle wrought-iron balconies flanking its left side. Both balconies have a bear cub holding a shield that stands in the corner: it is a reminder of the past activity of a metal craftwork company in the district. An elaborate frieze runs between first and second level, and two windows are topped with triangular pediments: the one on the right side is adorned with a bas-relief of bearded male head with a hat. On the top of the facade stands a sundial, neighboured by two finials. At street level, one can notice the grand portal, crowned by a mask of a beast.

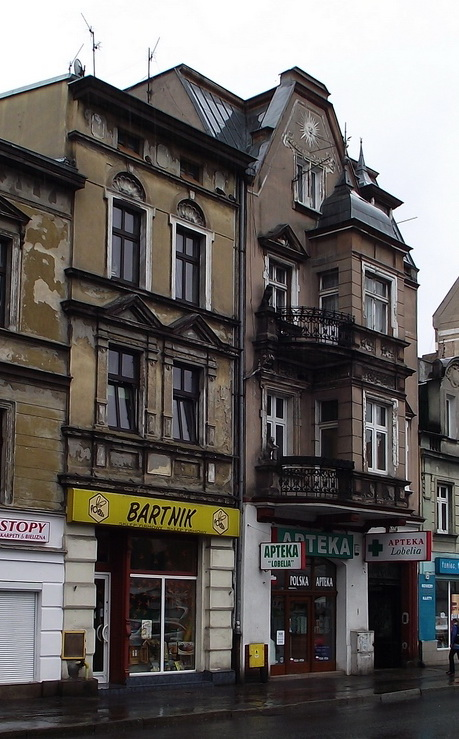
Main elevation

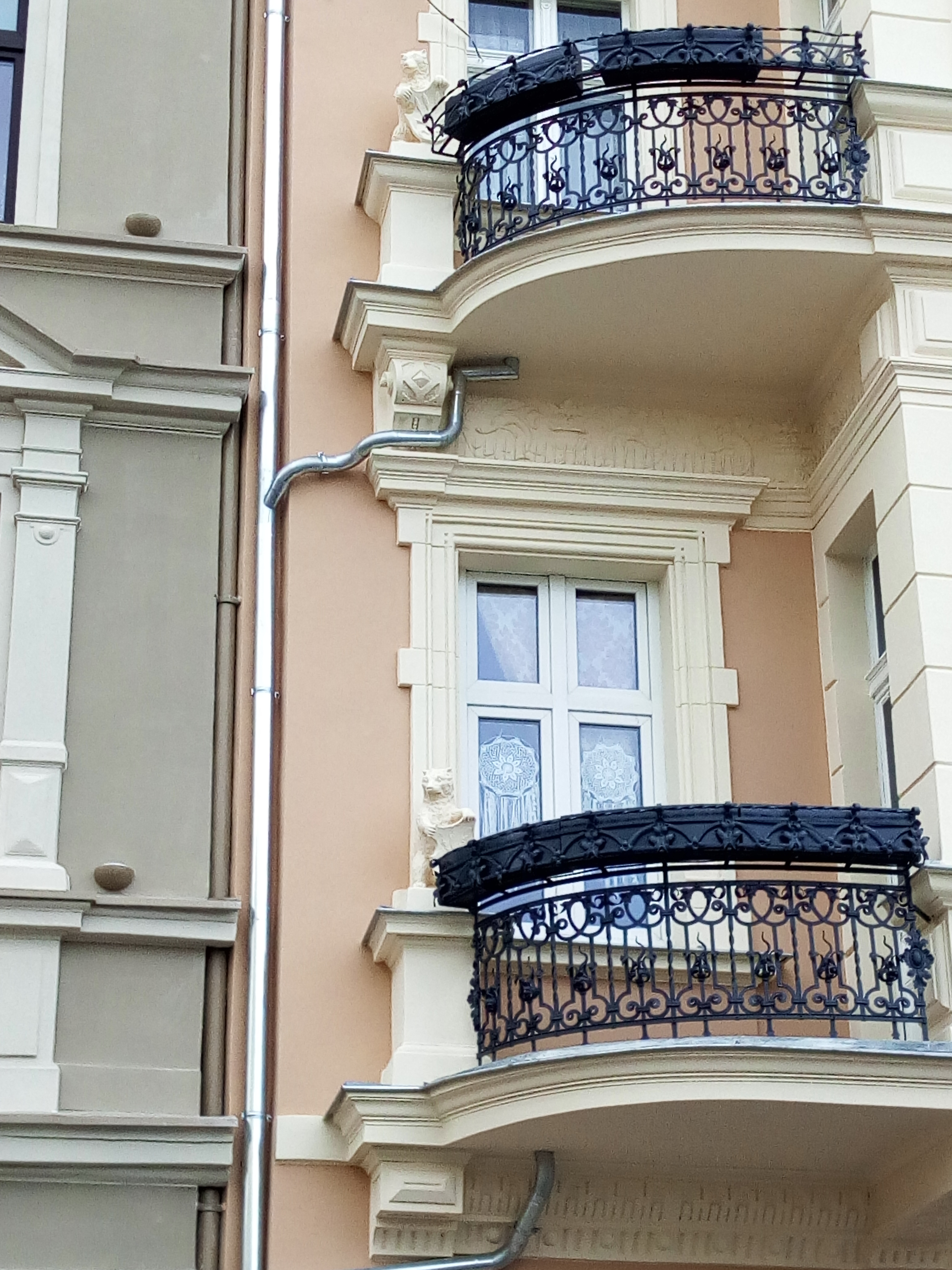
Bear cubs at the balconies

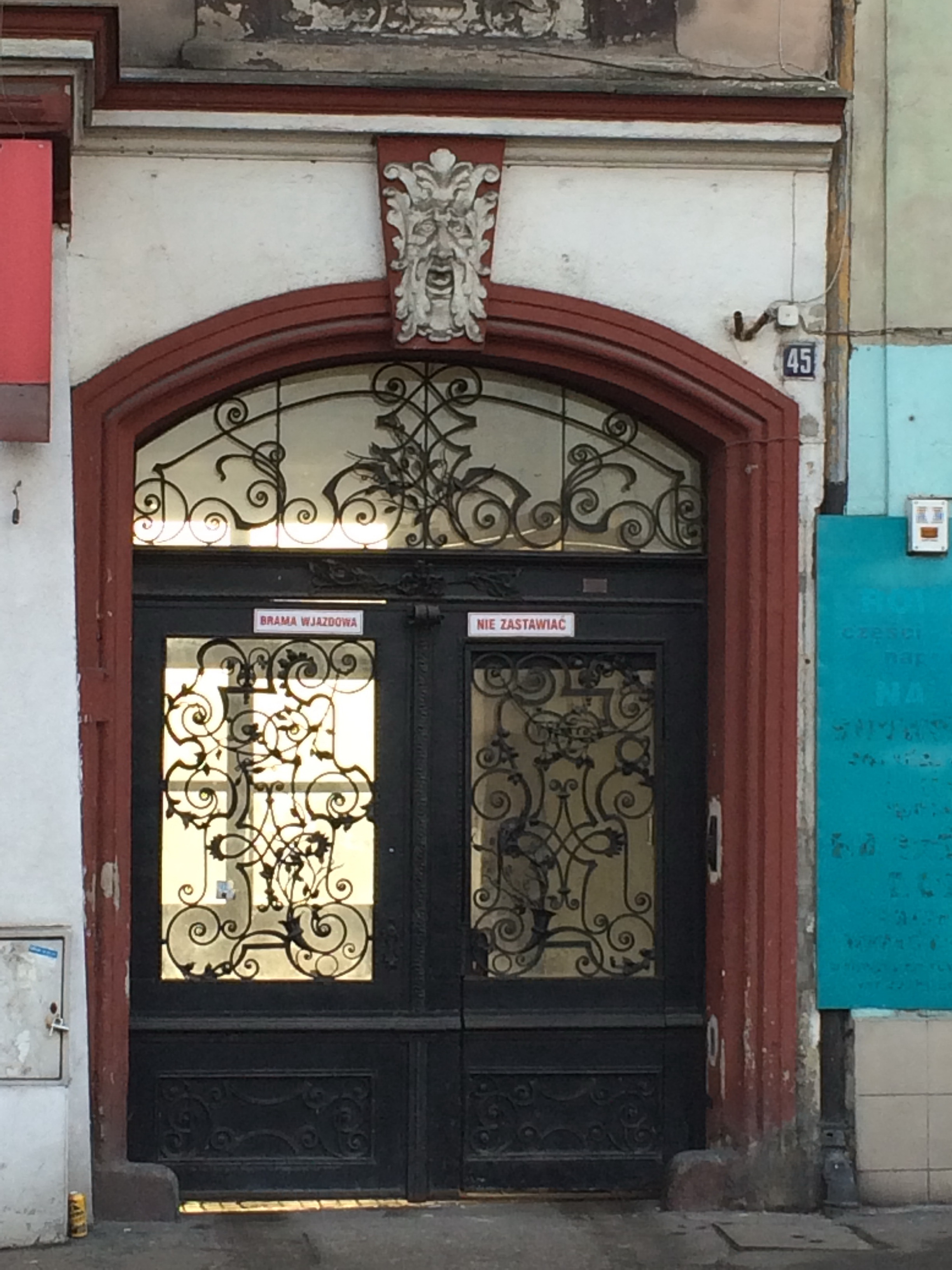
Main gate

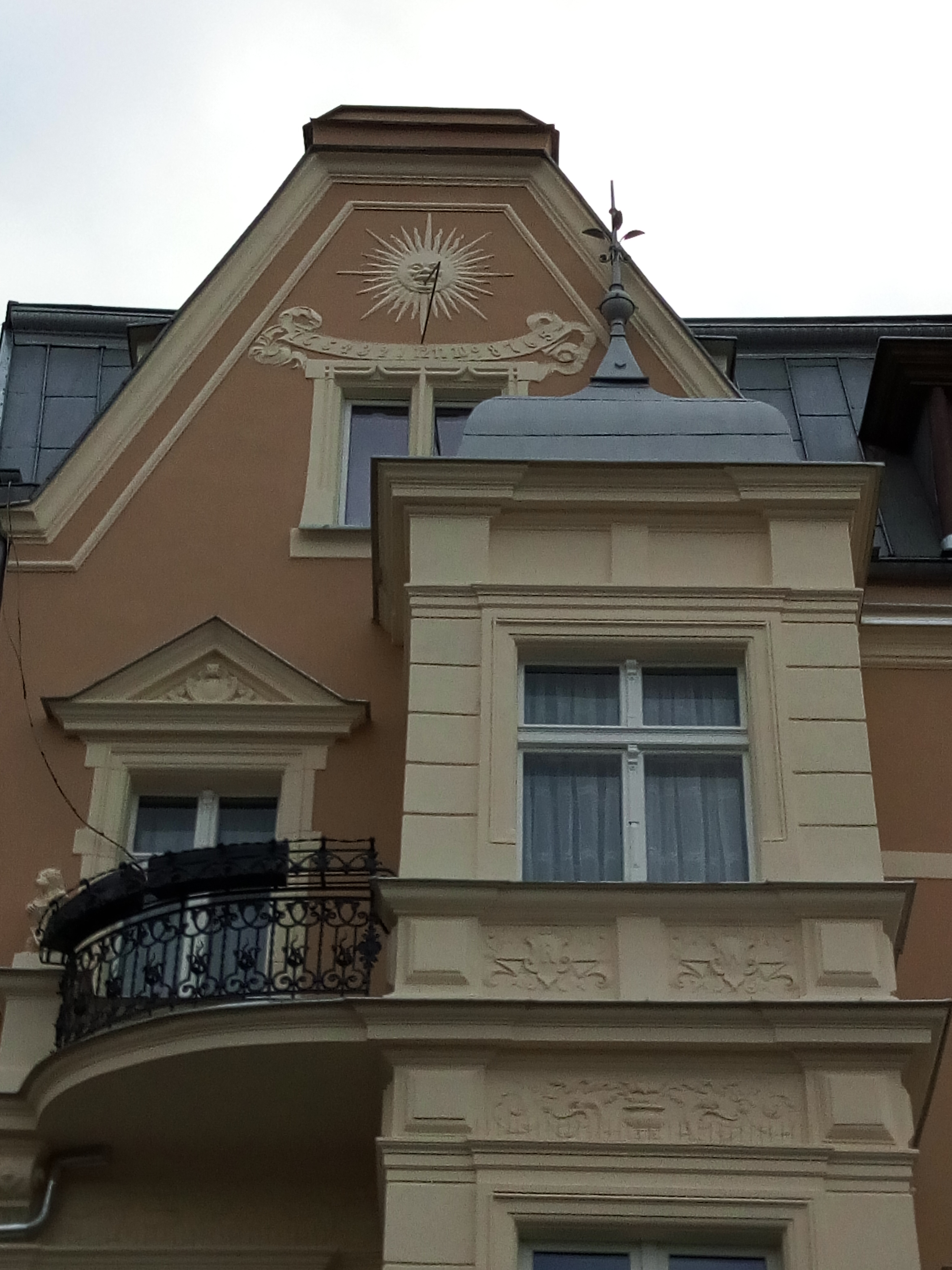
Top sundial

=== Tenement at 47 Śniadeckich Street ===
Late 1880s

Eclecticism

The building at Elisabethstraße 24 was the property of Robert Winkler, a merchant, also landlord of Elisabethstraße 23 (Nr.46). Nr.47 was the one he was registered as living in.

The long facade, with only one floor boasts a beautiful decoration on top of the gate, with two sphinx like woman figured shapes support another vegetal decoration with a mask. Traces of pilasters are still visible on the first floor, crowned by a full-length balustrade. The two ogee gables are also ornamented.

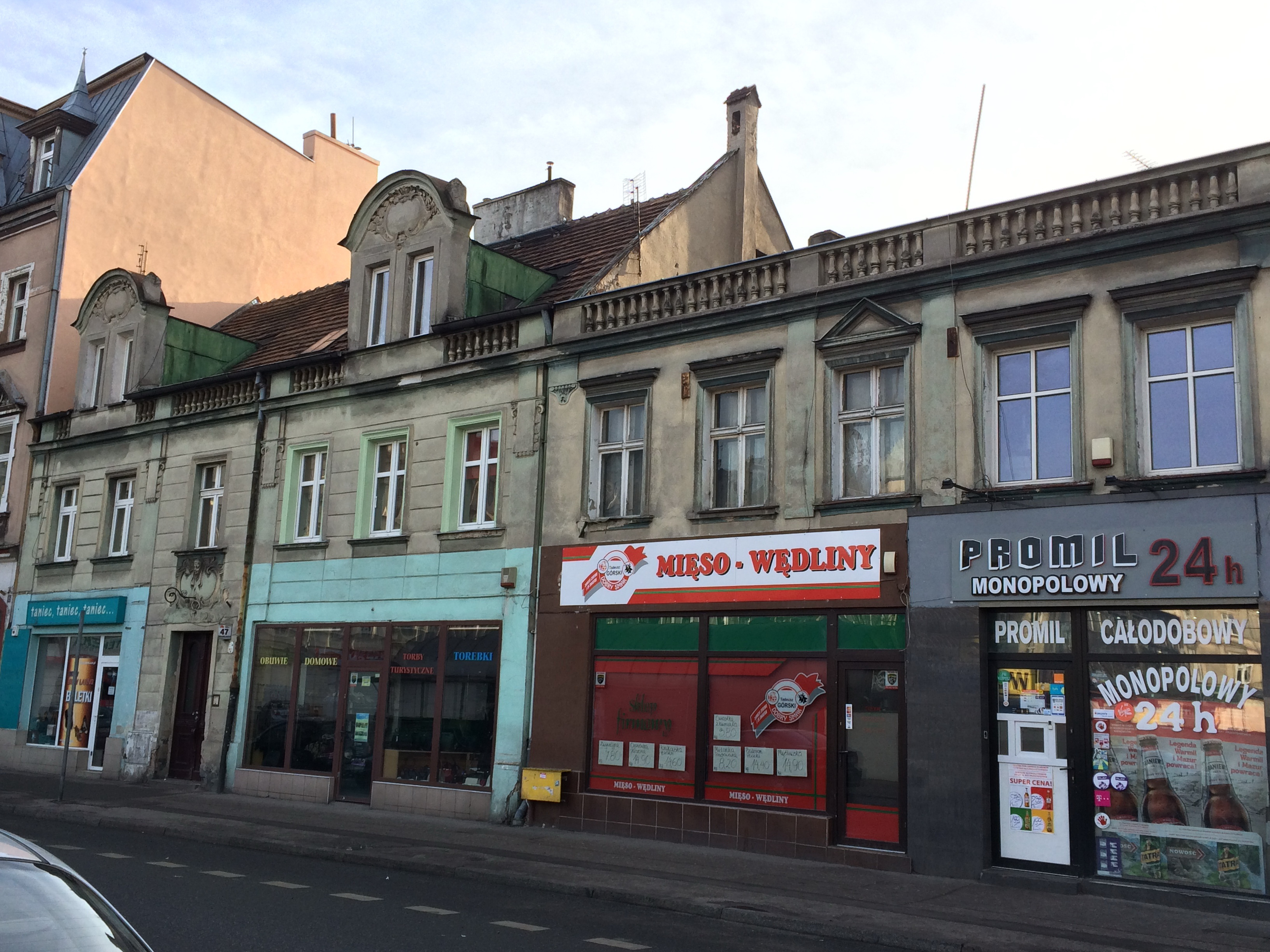
Main elevation

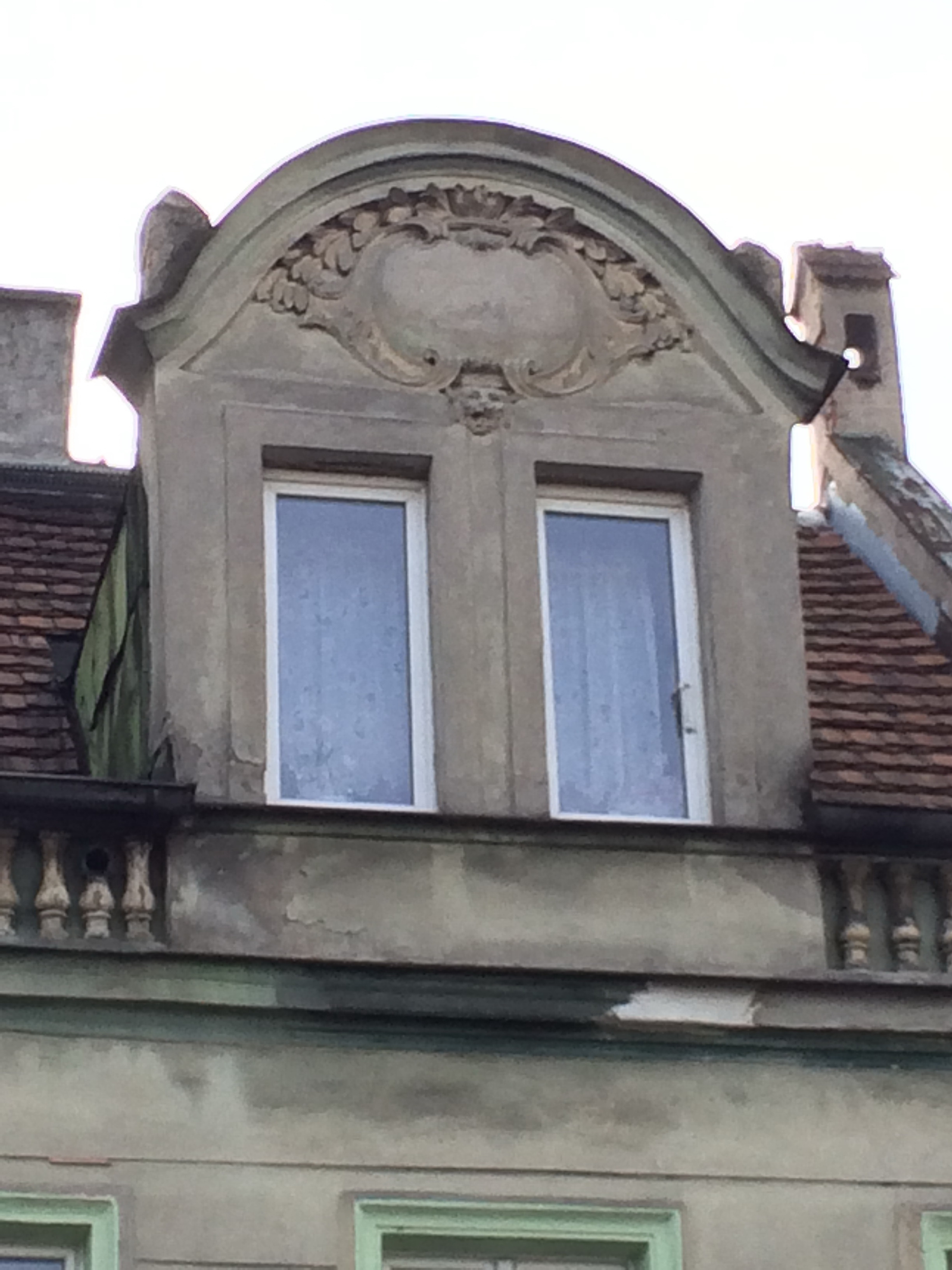
Gable

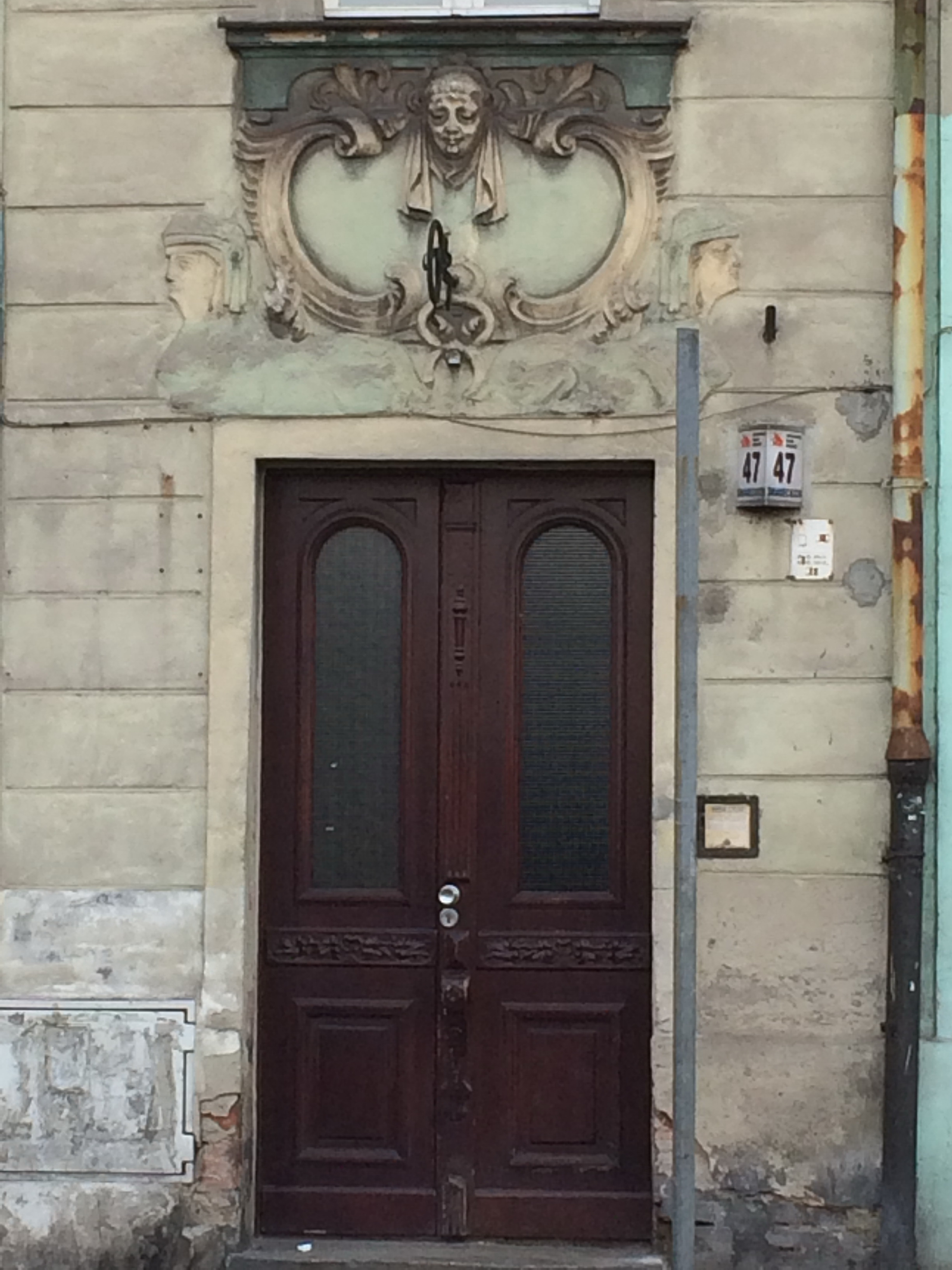
Main gate

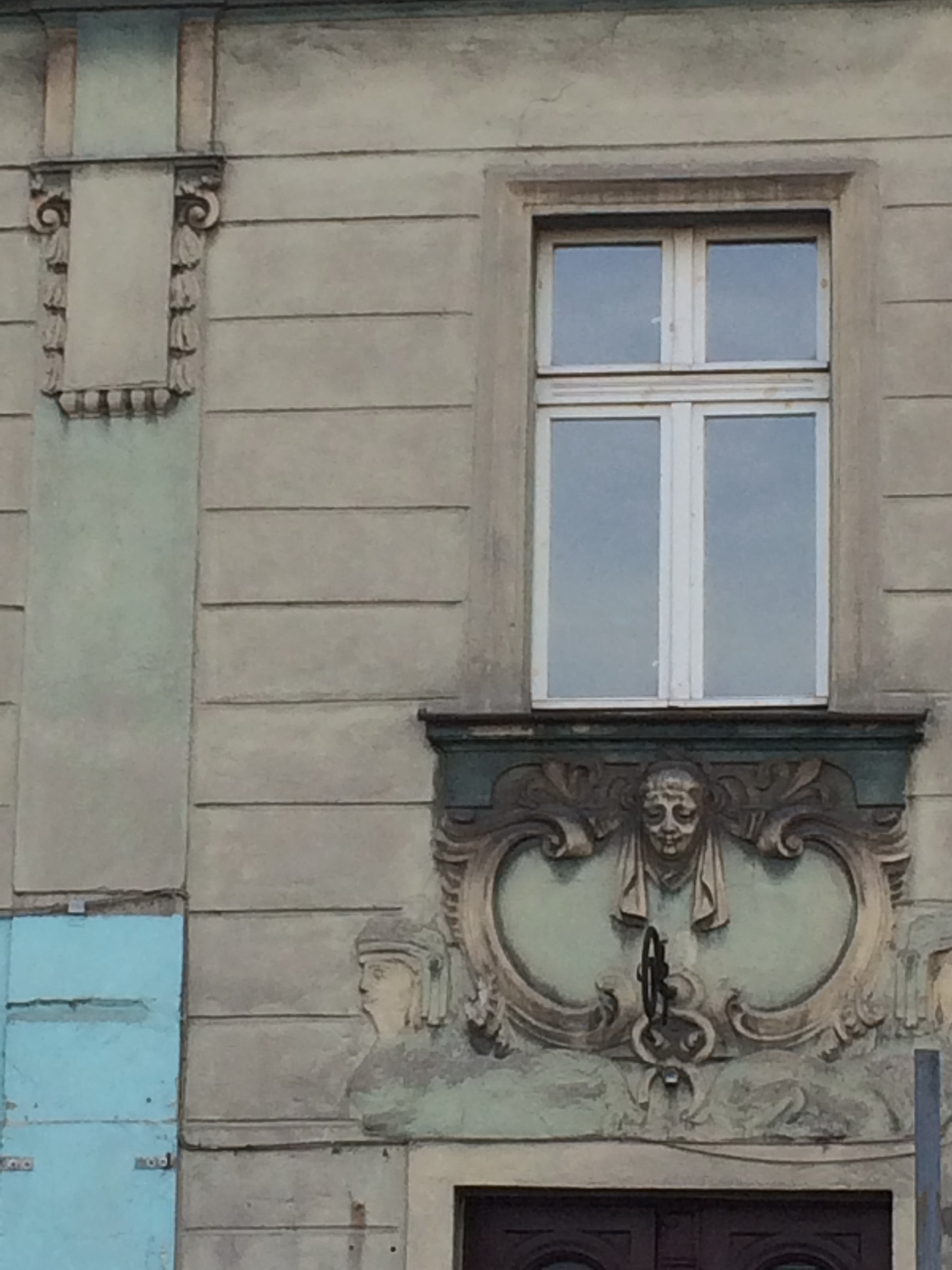
Detail of the facade

=== Tenement at 49 Śniadeckich Street ===
1911-1912

Art Nouveau-Modern architecture

The tenement stands in the corner with Jan Matejko Street. In Bromberg's time, address was Elisabethstraße 25.: owners were registered as "Ms Sendler and Genossen". In 1915, an architect, Walter Findeisen, lived in this house. The building houses today the Honorary Consul of the Federal Republic of Germany in Bydgoszcz

The tenement stands out of the local urban environment with its lean and high features. Due to its late inception (1910s), the building has been erected according to late Art Nouveau canons, thus it catches the eye among late 19th century edifices. The house architecture is underlined on the one hand by long vertical lines without any ornament (art), broken up on the first floor by horizontal bossages, and on the other hand by two massive bay windows and a modest bartizan. Building's elevation has been refurbished in 2015–2016.

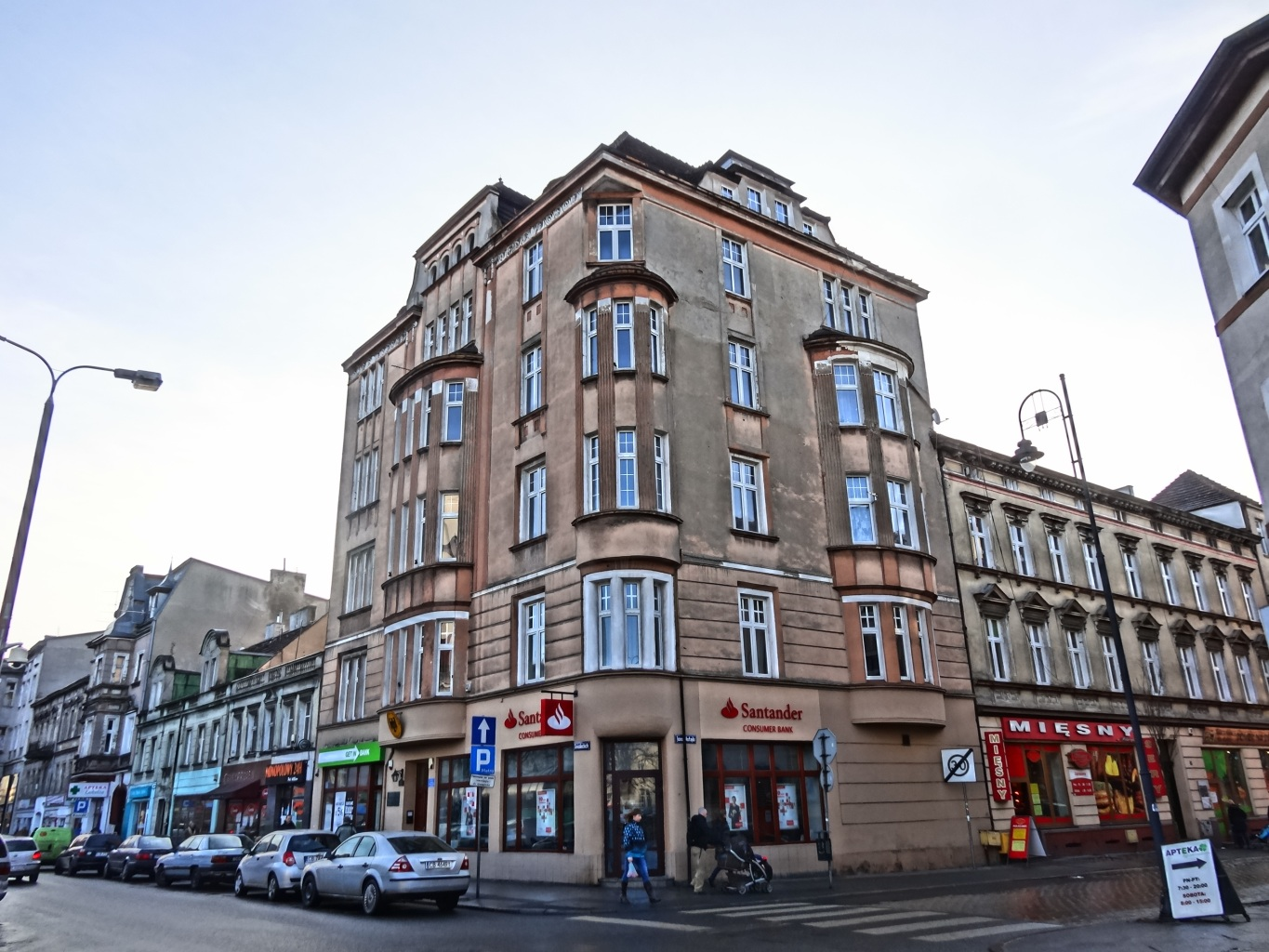
View from the street before renovation

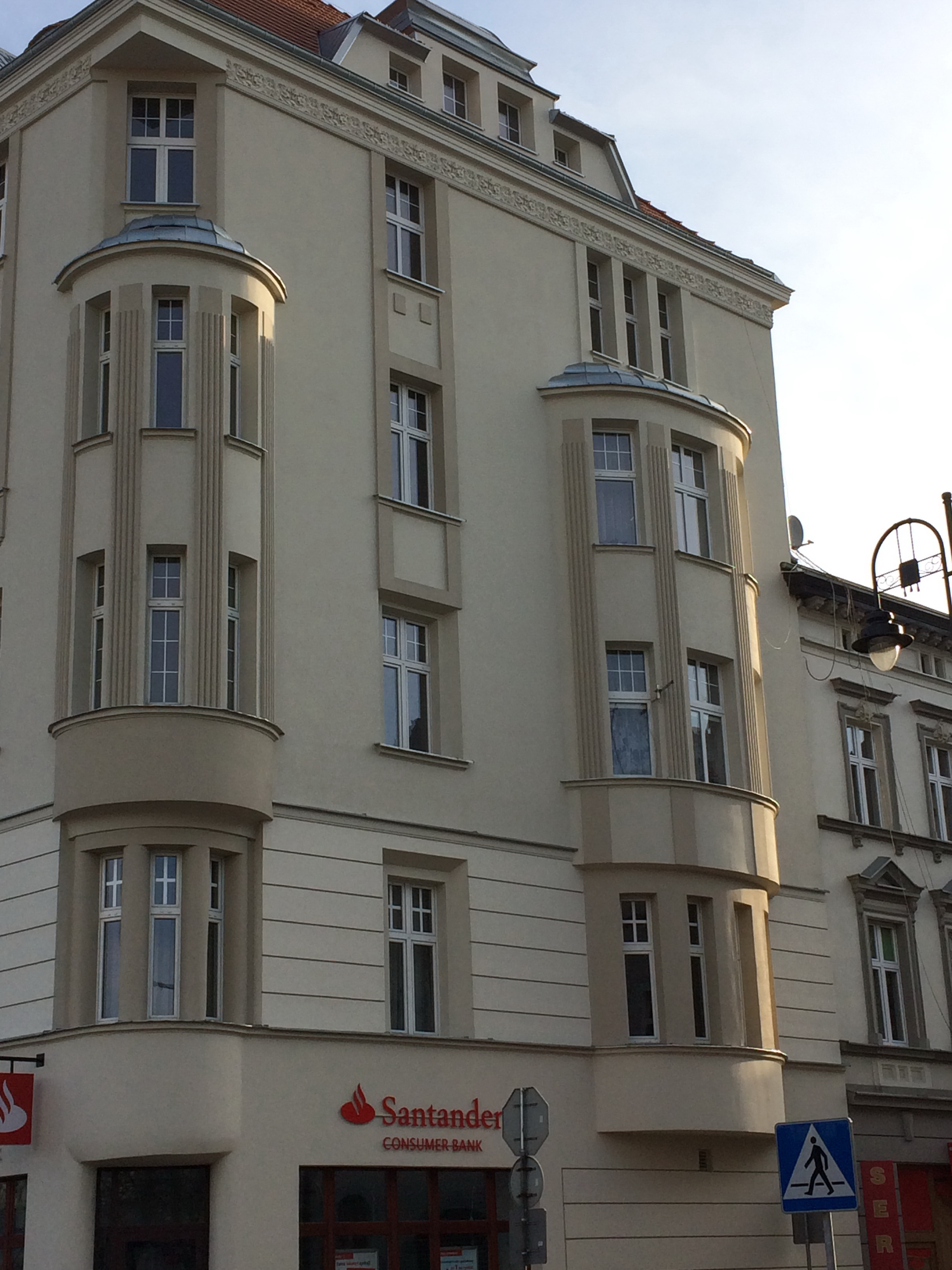
Elevation on Jan Matejko Street

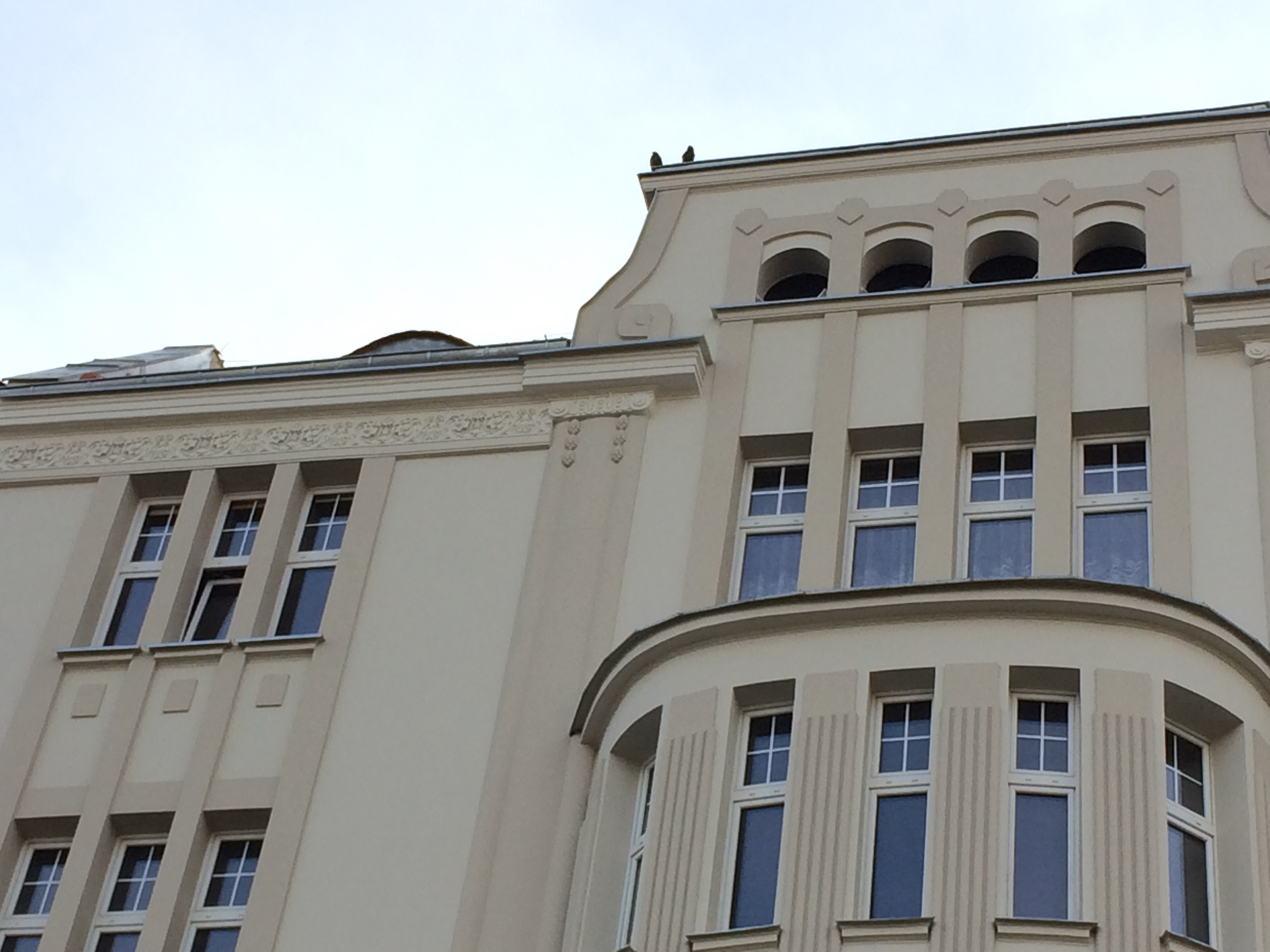
Detail of the upper part of the facade

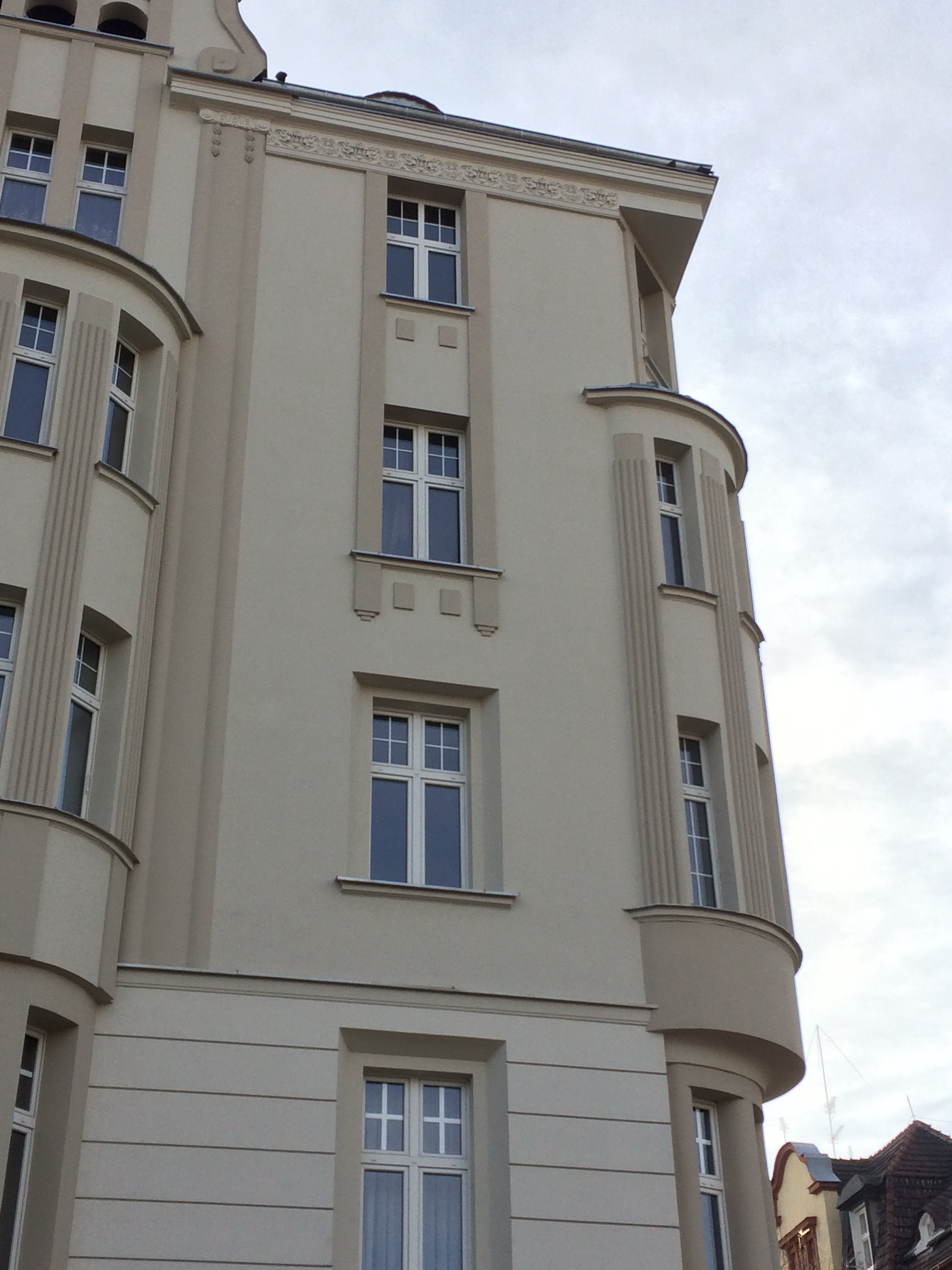
Detail of the bartizan

=== Tenement at 53 Śniadeckich Street ===
1895

Eclecticism, elements of Neo-Baroque

Originally at Elisabethstraße 27, it was the property of a real estate owner (German: Zimmermeister), Michael Engelhard, living at Nr.57. The building was designed for renting.

The elevation is essentially remarkable by the impressive decorated balconies with Neo-Baroque accents: balustrades, heavy corbels, pilasters around the openings and a highly ornamented grand lintel on the second floor.

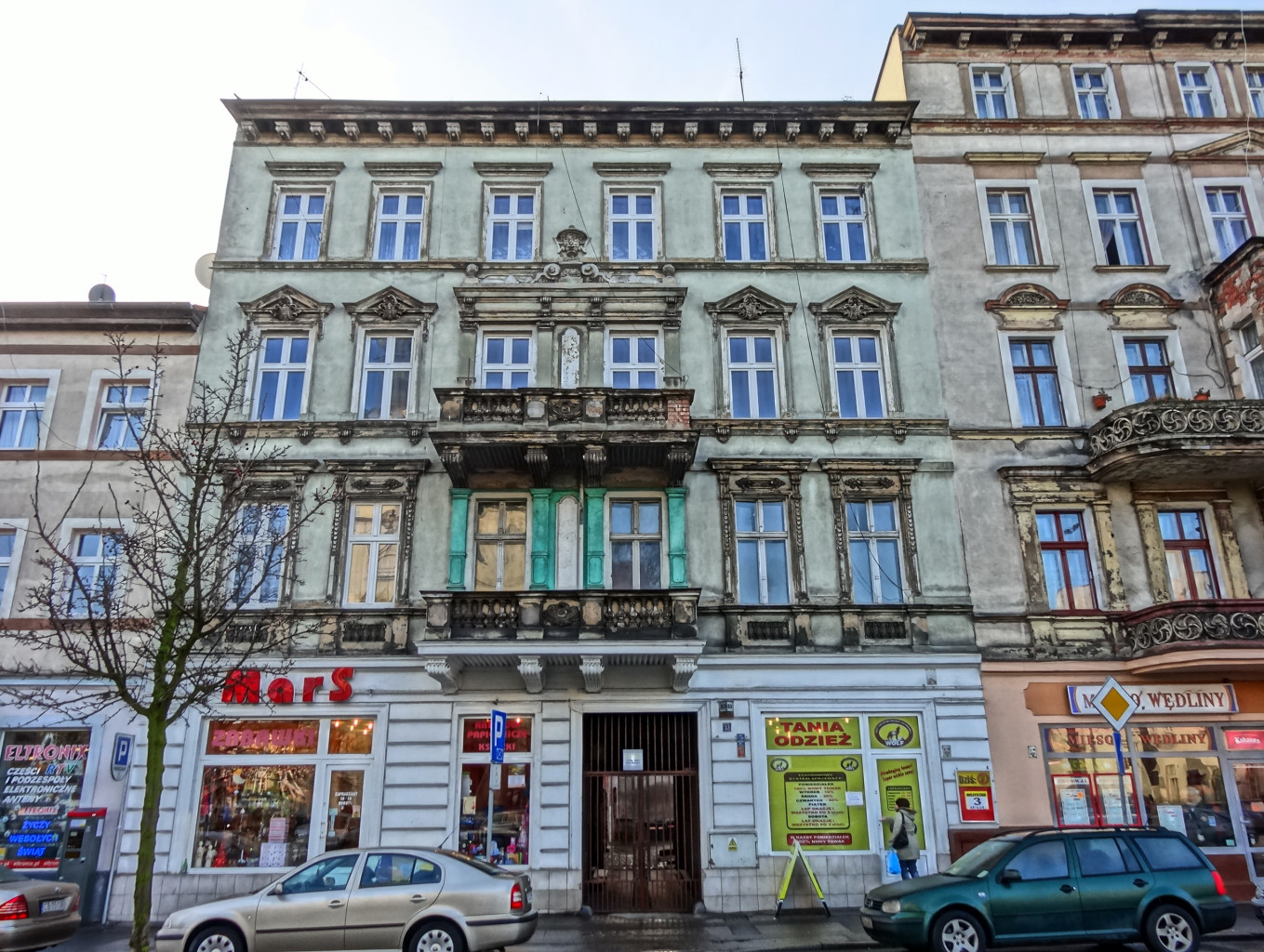
Main elevation from the street

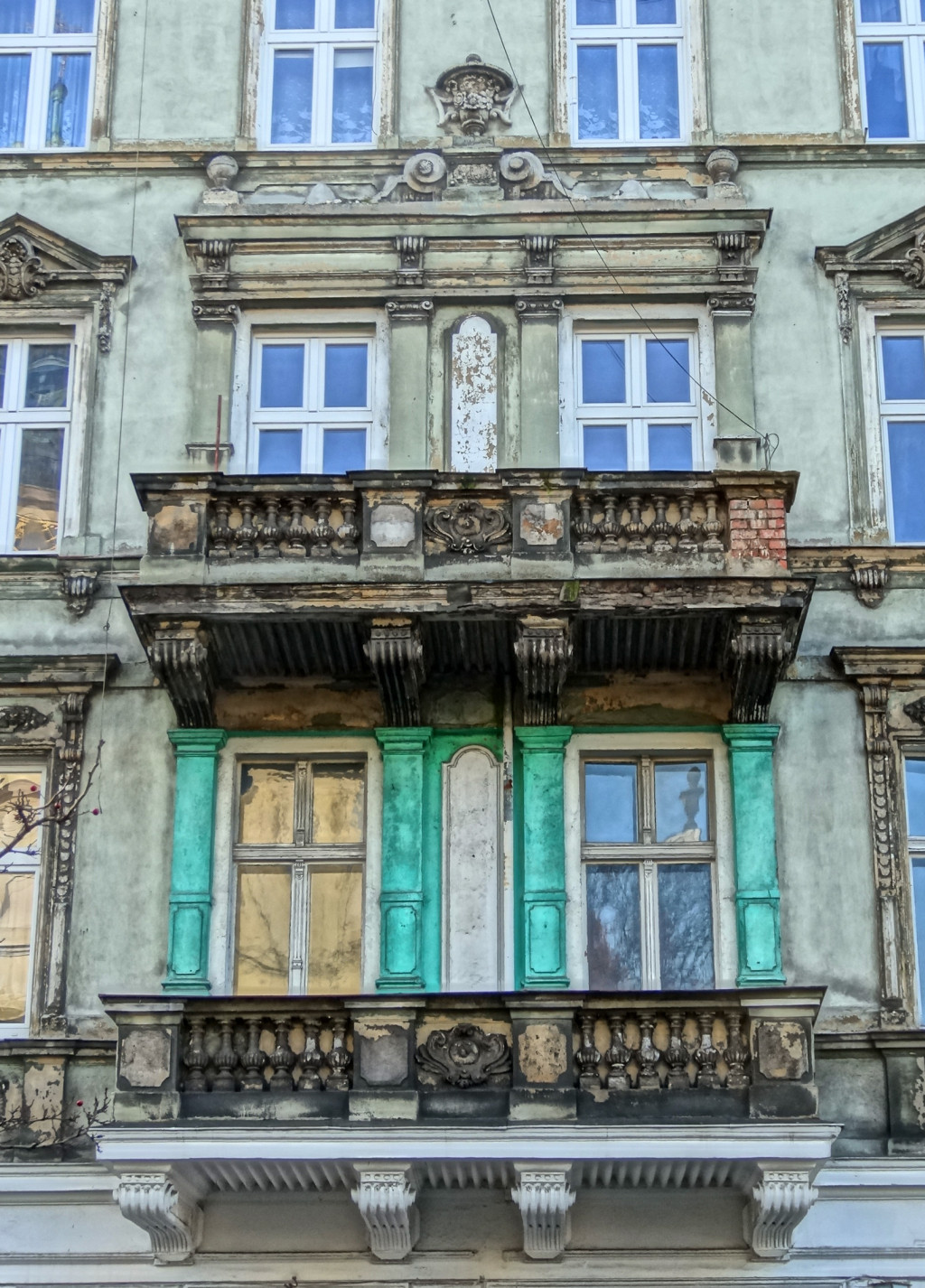
Detail of adornment

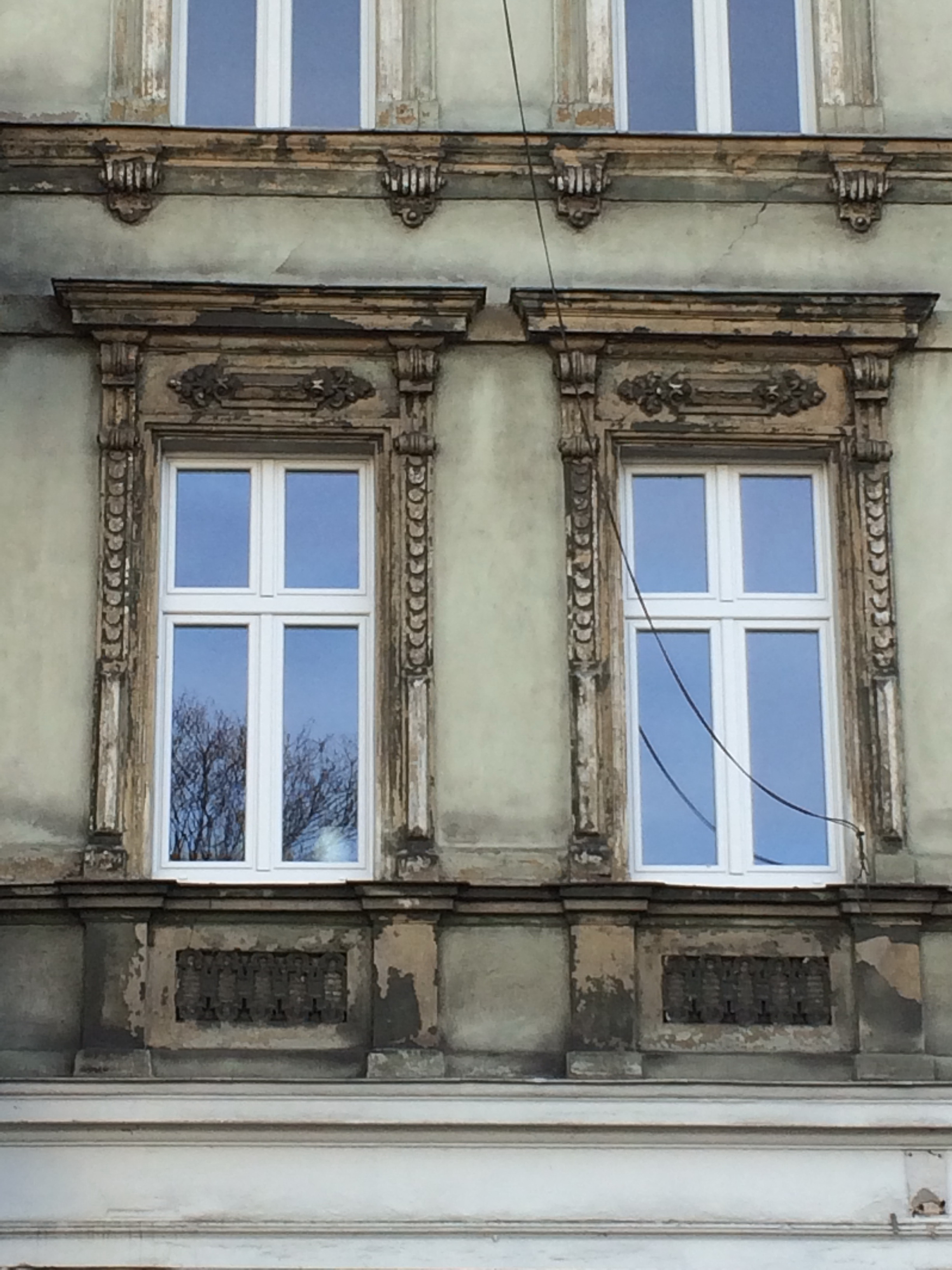
Decorated chambranles of the windows

=== Tenement at 55 Śniadecki Street ===
1899-1900

Eclecticism, elements of Neo-Baroque

Originally at Elisabethstraße 28, it was owned by Friedrich Gerth, a tailor: at that time, he lived at Nr.53. The building has been home place of Szczepan Jankowski, a Polish blind composer, organist and conductor of the Church of the Sacred Heart of Jesus. A memorial plaque has been unveiled on November 8, 2010.

Compared to Nr.53, Nr.55 is even more remarkable by its Neo-Baroque balconies complex. Both balconies flank a large bay window adorned with bossage and pilasters. Railings are adorned with wavy circle shapes placed like rosettes.

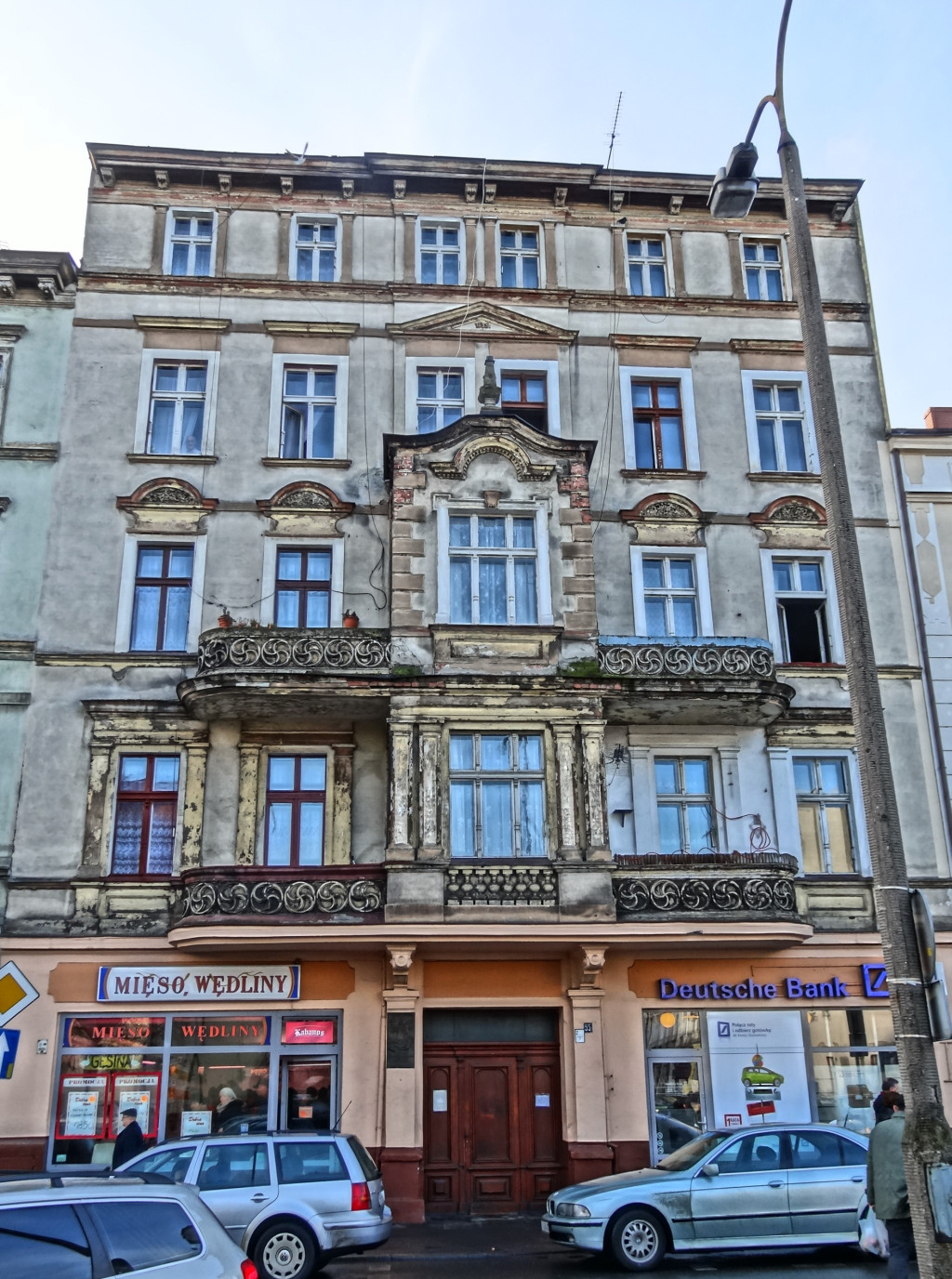
Main elevation

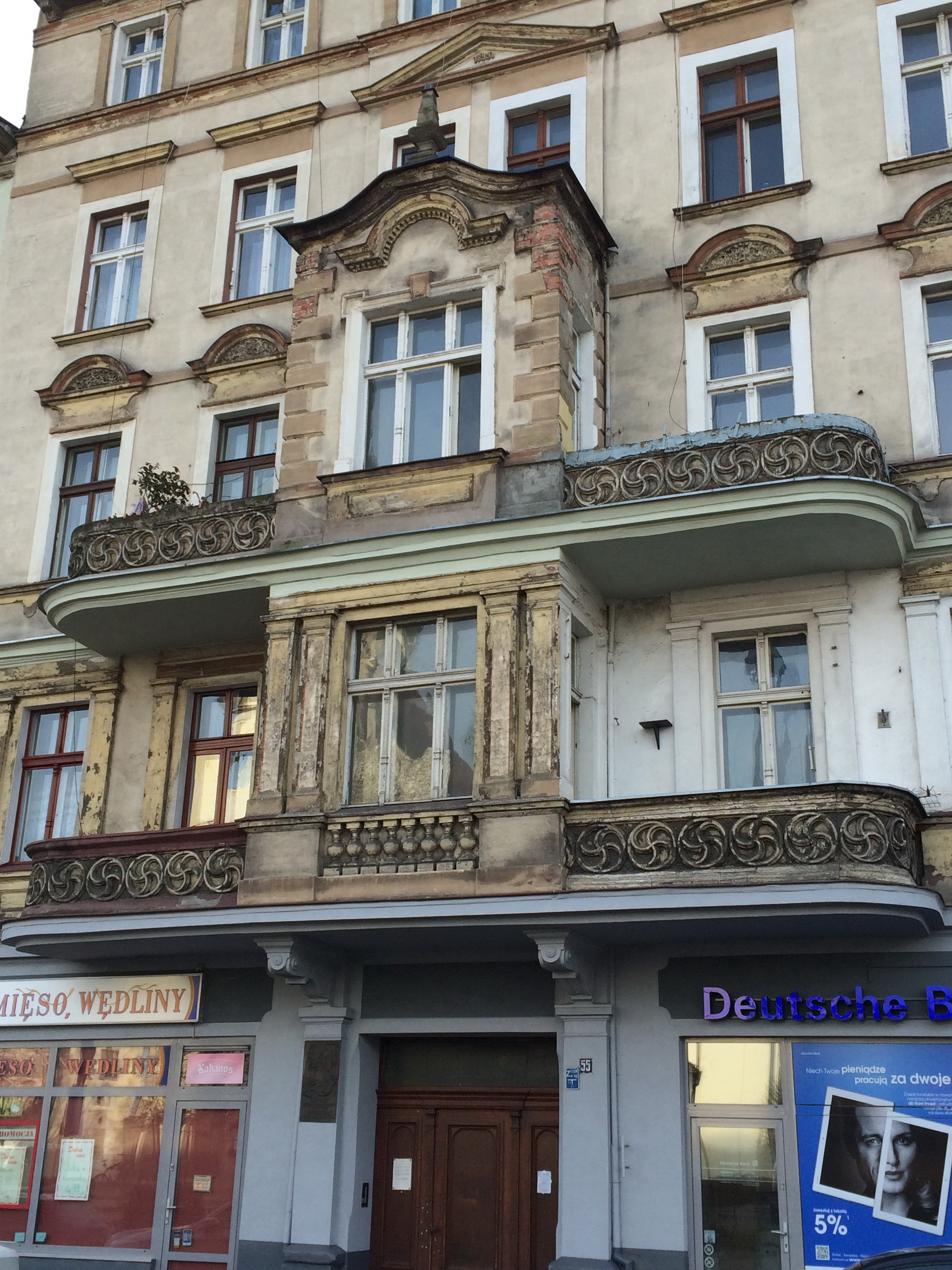
Balconies

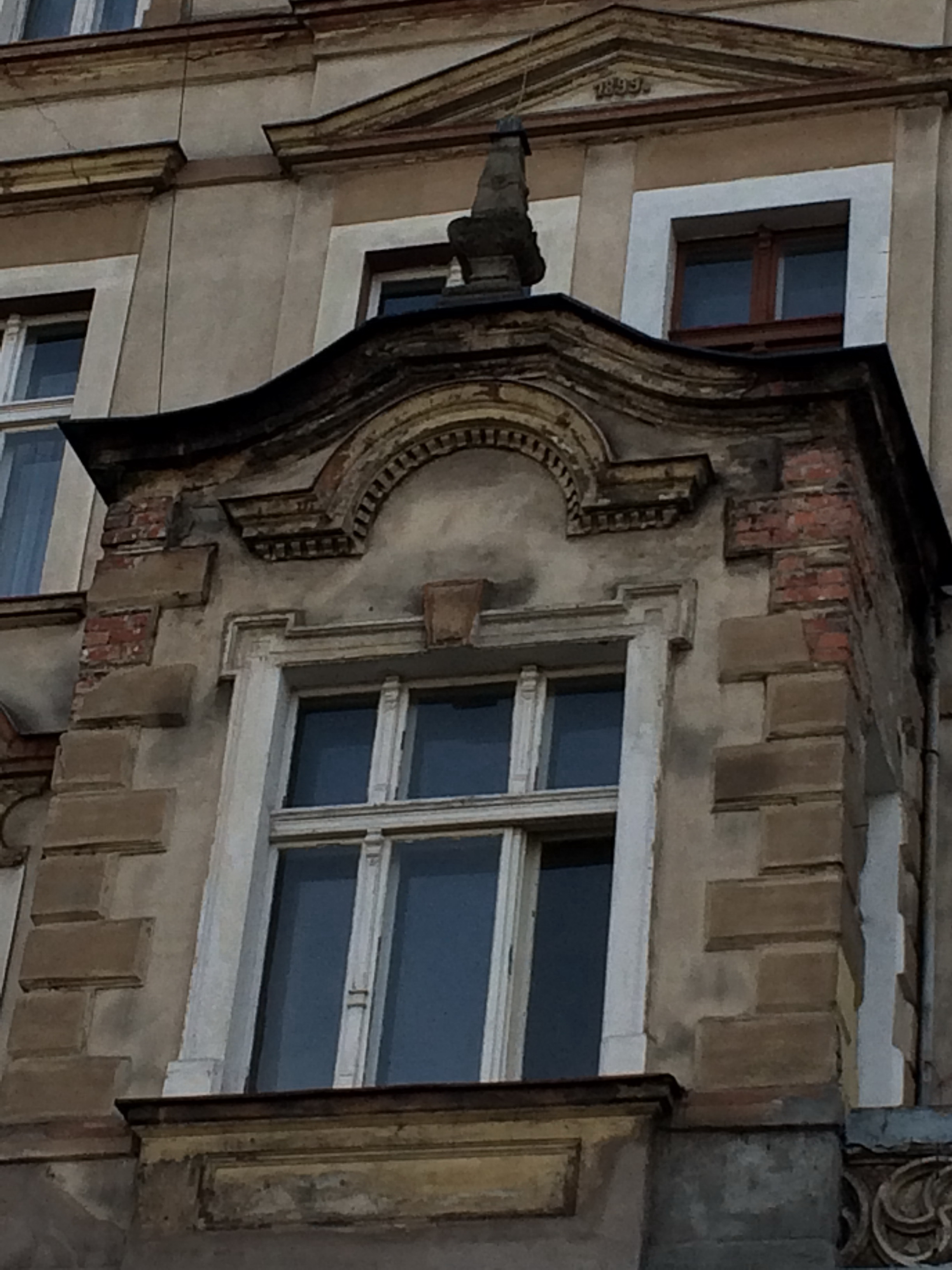
Close up view on balcony

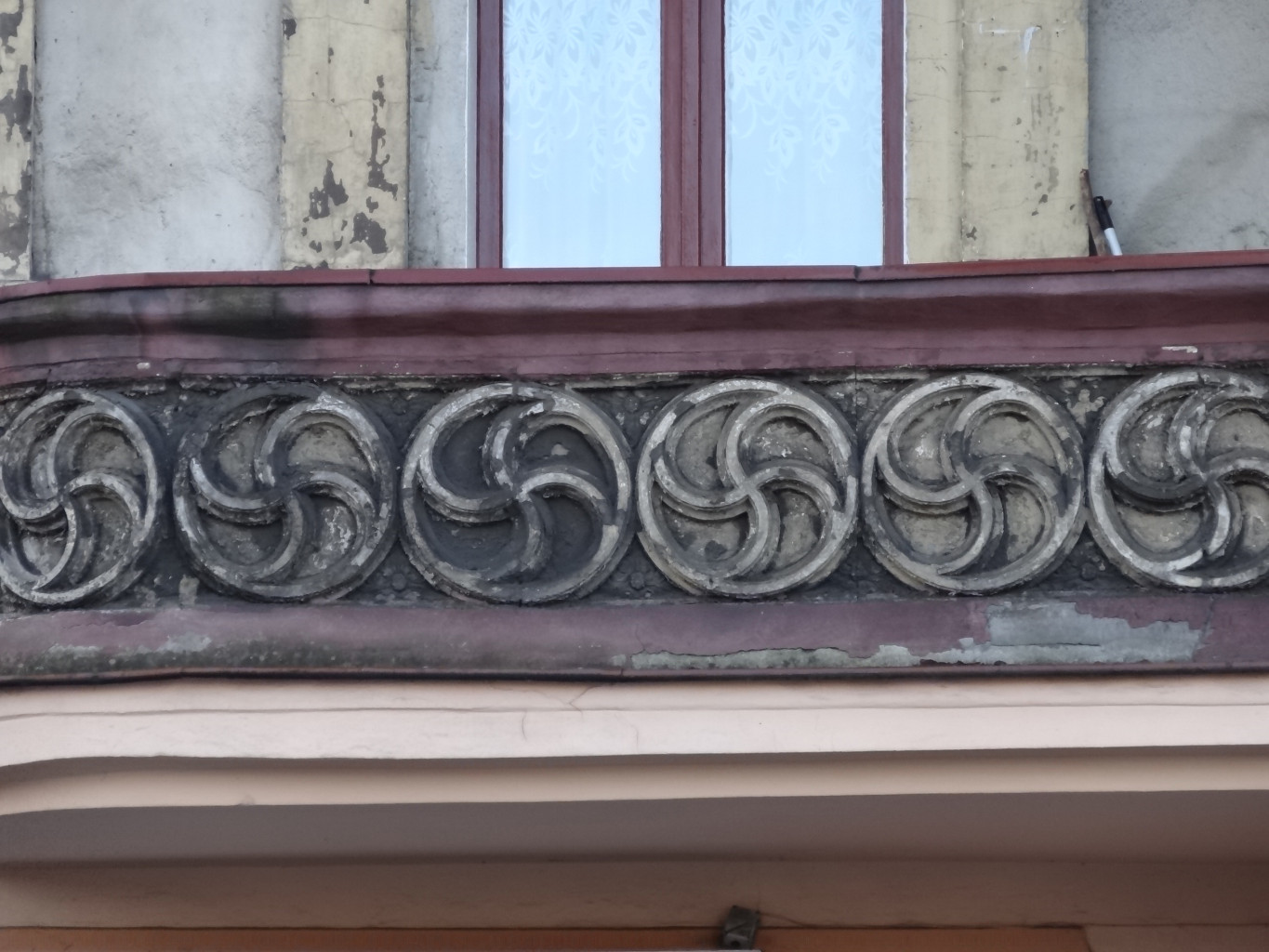
Rosette detail

=== Tenements at 57 Śniadeckich Street ===
Late 1870s

Left house: Eclecticism, Neo-Renaissance

Right house: Modern architecture

Original address was Elisabethstraße 29: it was owned by Carl Wilhelm Feyertag, a rentier, living at "Bahnhoffstraße 11" (now Dworcowa Street Nr.27): he also owned the house at Nr.19. Since 1956, the left tenement houses the family-run bakery "KP", established in 1922 by Franciszek Poćwiardowski. Today the ground floor of the right building houses 1956-established ice cream firm "Lodziarnia Żak".

Although from the 1870s, the left elevation has been rebuilt and presents early Art Nouveau elements like the vegetal ornaments on the wavy shaped gable. Right facade displays early modernist elements, expressed in the very shape of the elevation, with the round bay window topped by a balcony, and the multitude of narrow and thin openings.

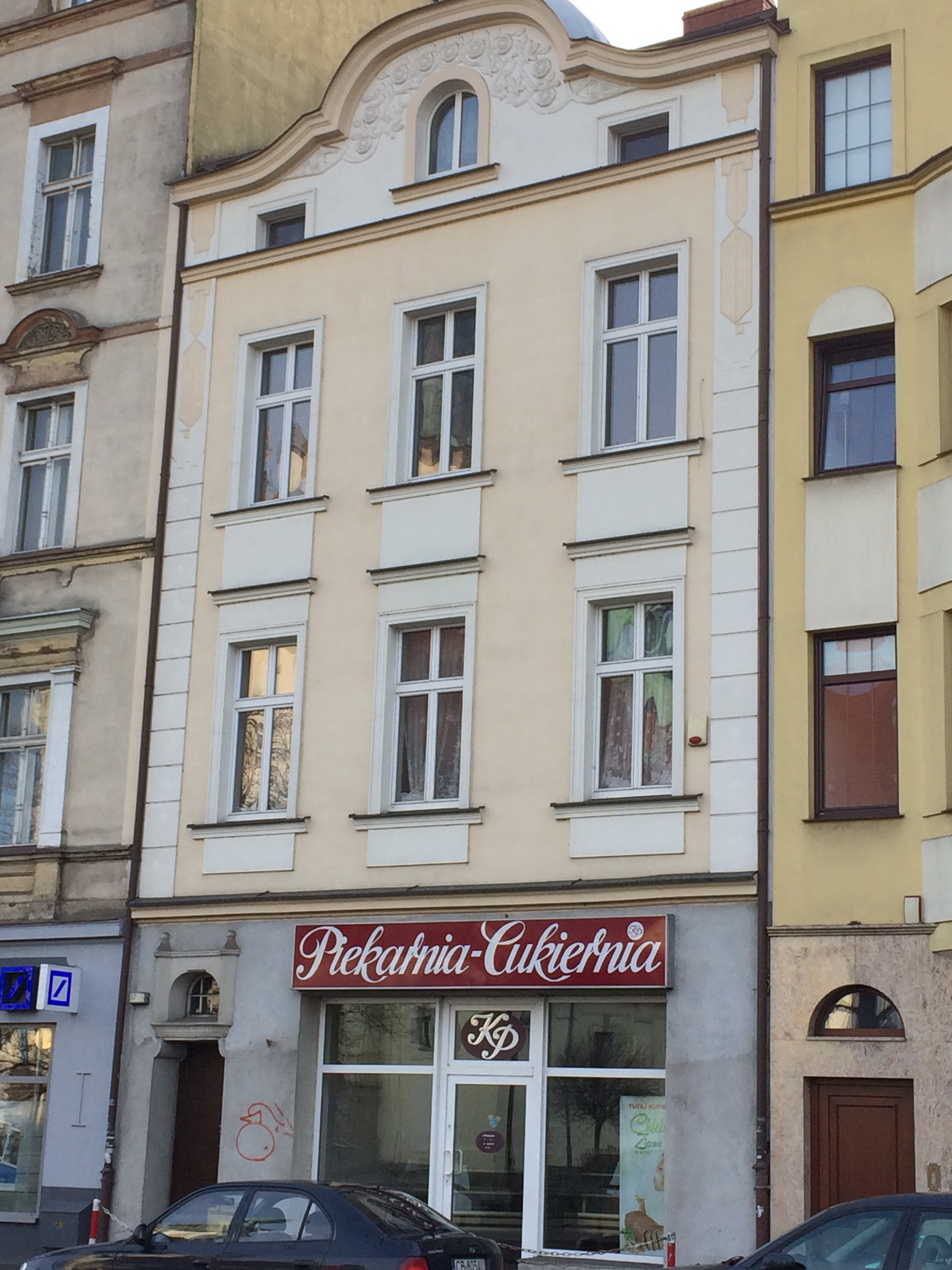
Left facade elevation

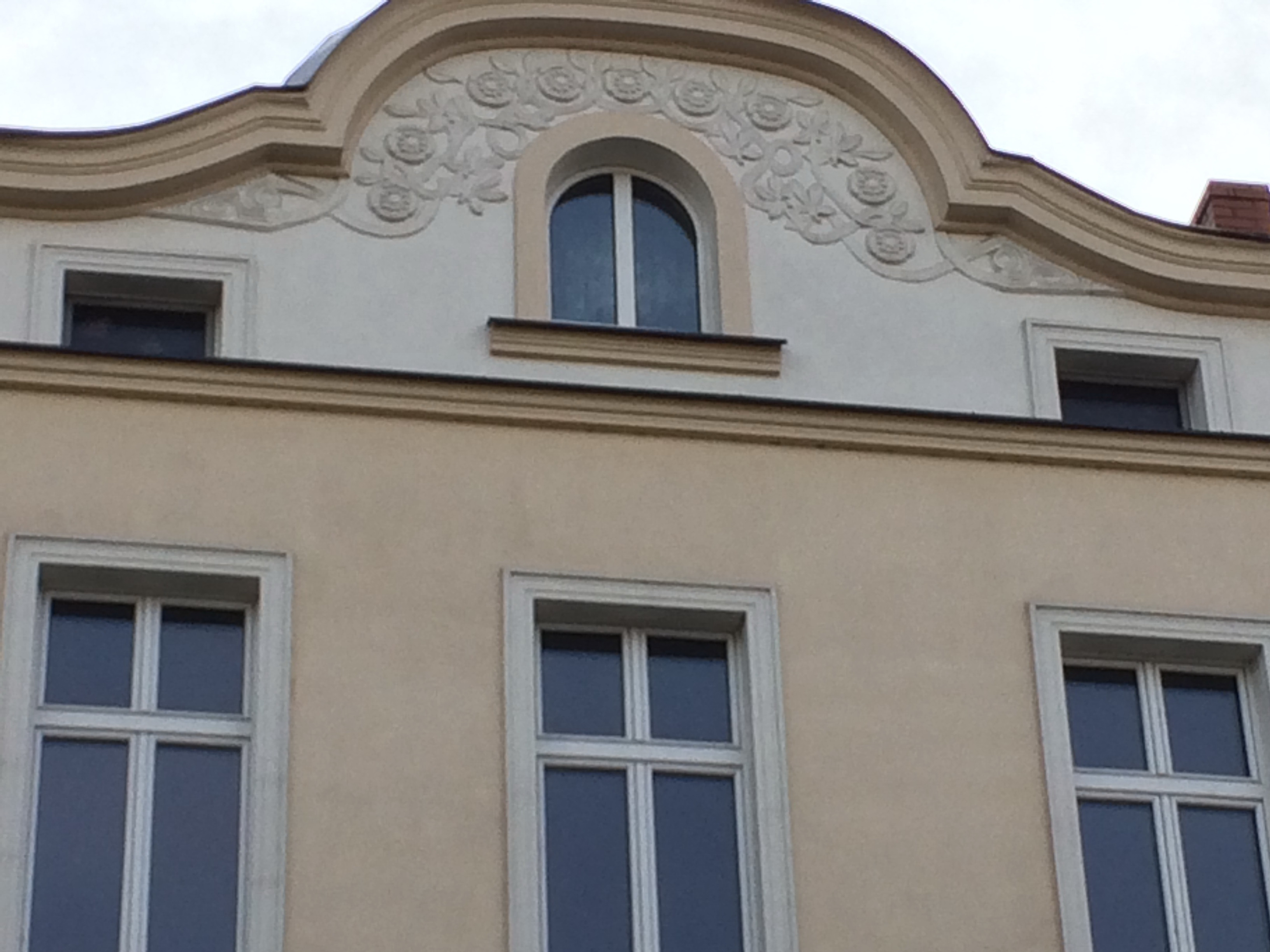
Detail of the gable

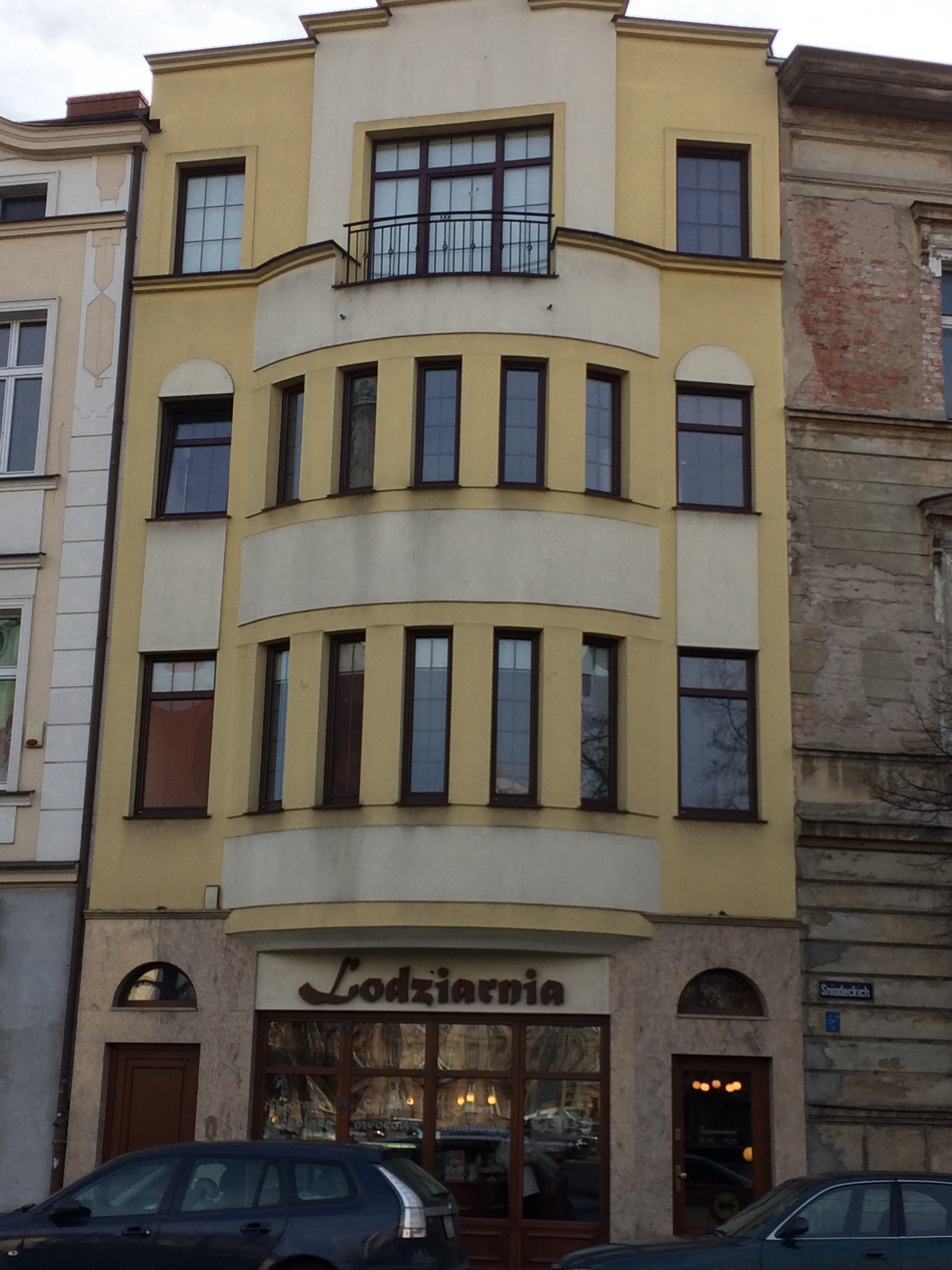
Right facade elevation

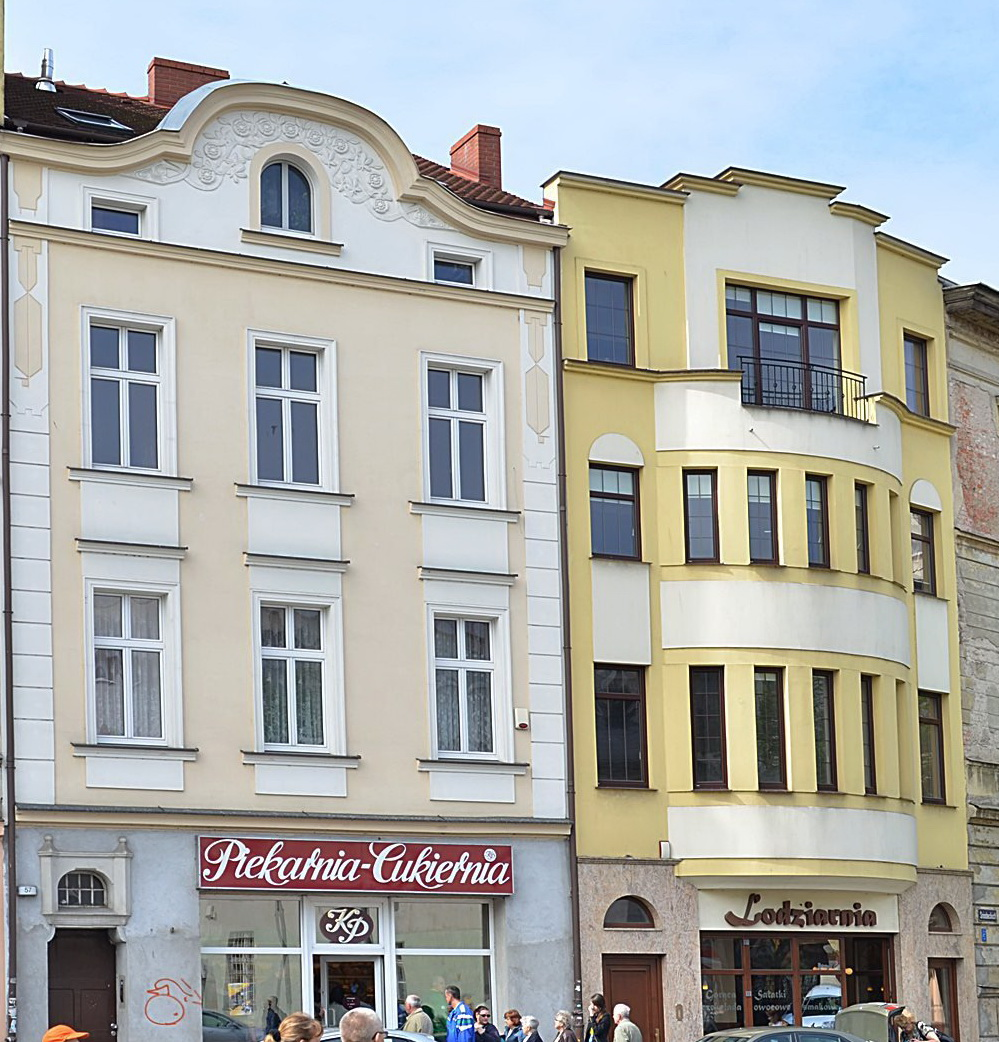
Both facades from the street
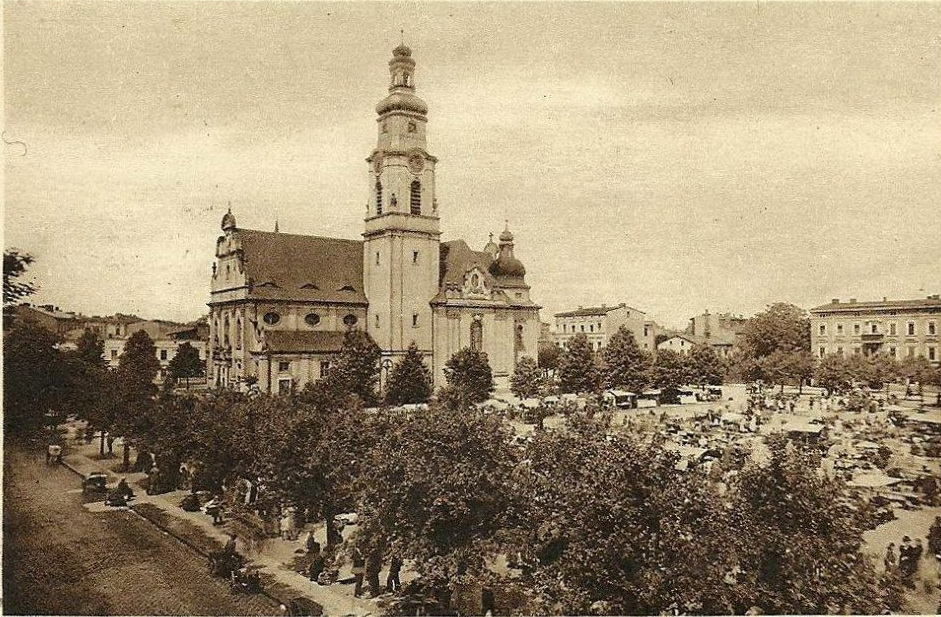
The square in 1917

== See also ==
- Bydgoszcz
- Church of the Sacred Heart of Jesus in Bydgoszcz
- Bydgoszcz Architects (1850-1970s)

== Bibliography ==
- (in Polish) Przewodnik po Bydgoszczy. Bydgoszcz: Urząd Miasta Bydgoszczy. 2014.
