= Mazowiecka street (Bydgoszcz) =

Street in Bydgoszcz, Poland

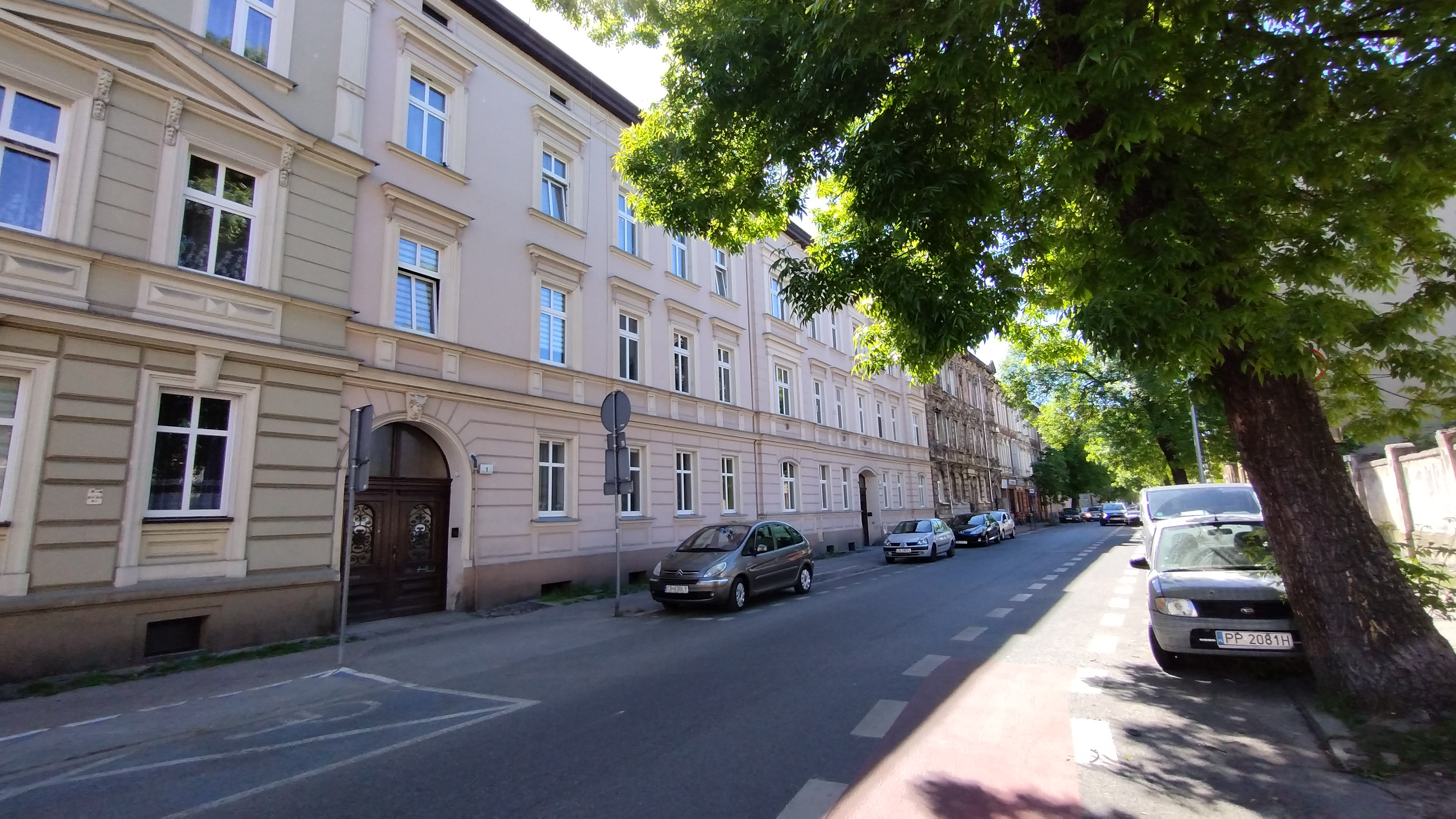
- View of the south frontages

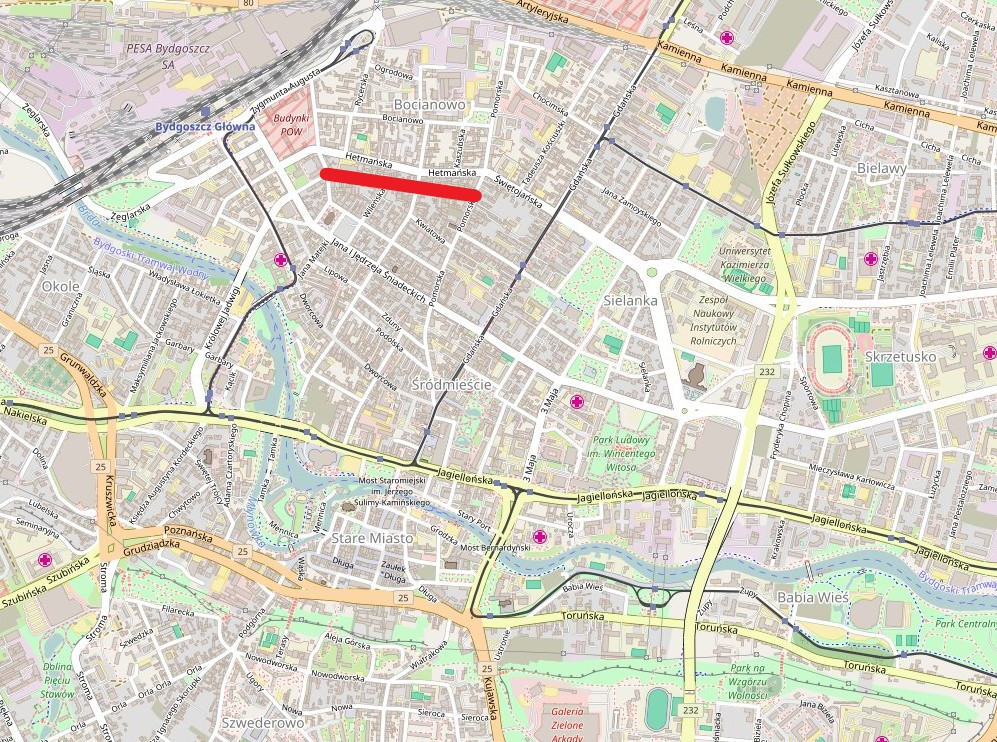
- Mazowiecka street highlighted on a map
- Native name: Ulica Mazowiecka w Bydgoszczy (Polish)
- Former name: Heynestraße / Heinestraße / Heinegostraße / Memel straße
- Part of: Śródmieście district
- Namesake: Mazovia
- Owner: City of Bydgoszcz
- Length: 500 m (1,600 ft)
- Width: c. 10 metres (33 ft)
- Location: Bydgoszcz, Poland
- Coordinates: 53°07′58″N 18°00′08″E
- Major junctions: Pomorska Street, Sienkiewicza Street, Wileńska street, Sowińskiego street

Construction
- Construction start: Late 1870s
- Completed: 1910

Mazowiecka street is a path in the city of Bydgoszcz, Poland. Its buildings still display a mix of eclectic architectural facades as well as highlight the important urban industrialisation in the history of the city.

== History and location ==
A map of Bromberg dated 1876 depicts the pathway, without any naming nor plots. Two years later, the city address book makes the first reference to 8 buildings on Heinestraße. The development of the street has been gradual and eventually achieved in 1910.

The street bore the following names through its existence:

- 19th century - 1920, Heinestraße or Heynestraße. Friedrich Hermann Heyne (1813–1856) was the Bürgermeister of Bromberg from 1845 to 1856, at a time of dynamic economic development, in particular with the opening of the city to the network of the Prussian Eastern Railway.
- German occupation (1939 - 1945), Memel straße, in reference to the Memel Territory (German: Memelland), the northernmost part of the German province of East Prussia.
- 1920 - 1939 and since 1945, Ulica Mazowiecka .

The current appellation refers to the historical region of Mazovia, in mid-north-eastern Poland. It spans the North European Plain, roughly between Łódź and Białystok.

The street follows an approximately east–west path, from Pomorska Street to Aleksandra Fredry street; on the way, it intersects Sienkiewicza, Wileńska and Sowińskiego streets.

== Main areas and edifices ==
=== Tenement at 51 Pomorska Street, corner with Mazowiecka street ===
The facade of the building, recently renovated, displays nice neoclassical features, mirroring the abutting tenement at Nr.49, with a bit more motifs: pilasters, tympanum on Mazowiecka street and a corner facade with balustrade, topped by round ornaments.

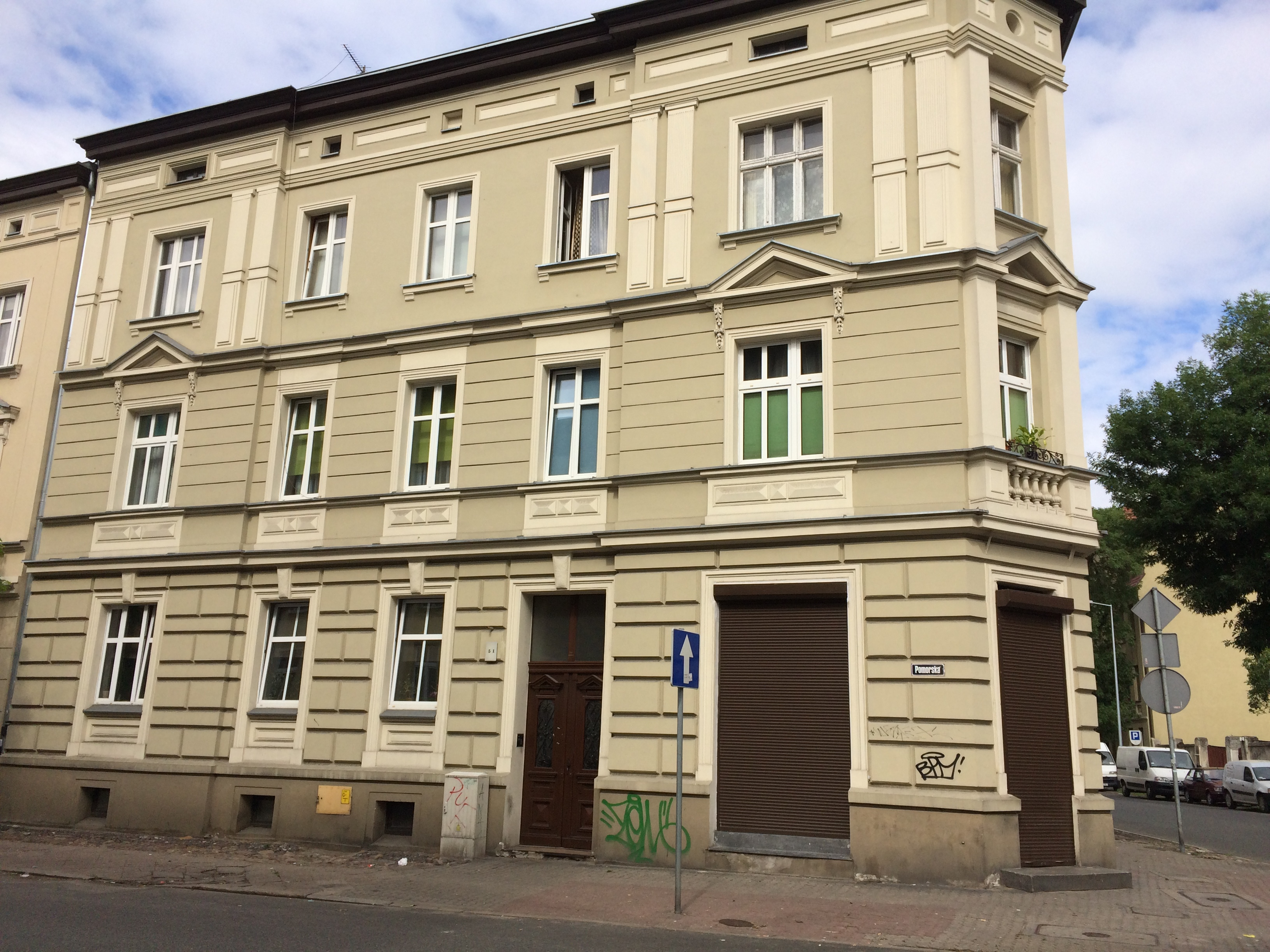
Facade on Pomorska street

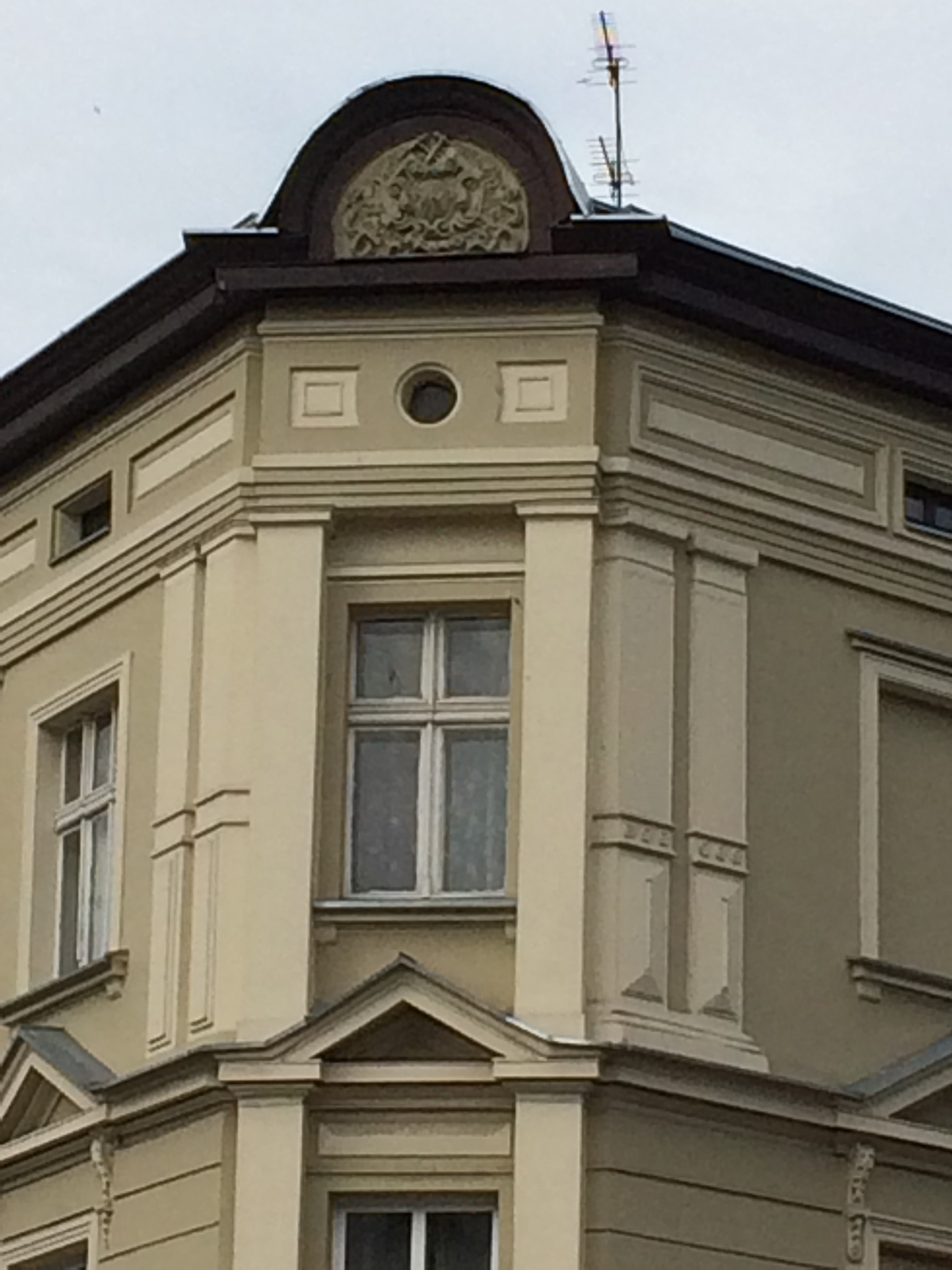
Corner detail

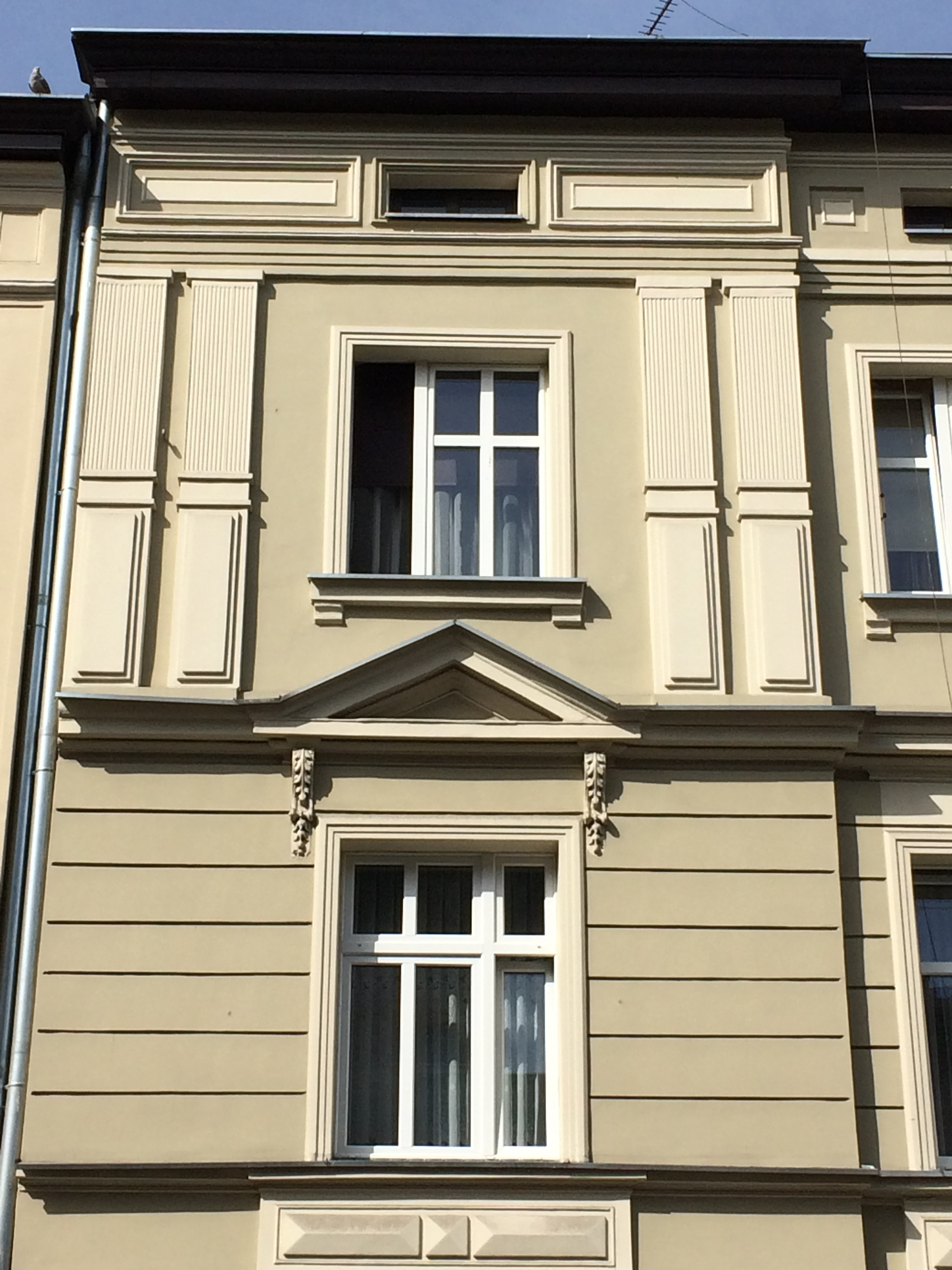
Detail of window adorning

=== Tenement at 53 Pomorska Street, corner with Mazowiecka street ===
1893–1894

Historicism

Initial address was Heinestraße 2. The Bräuer family lived there from the erection of the tenement in the 1880s until World War I.

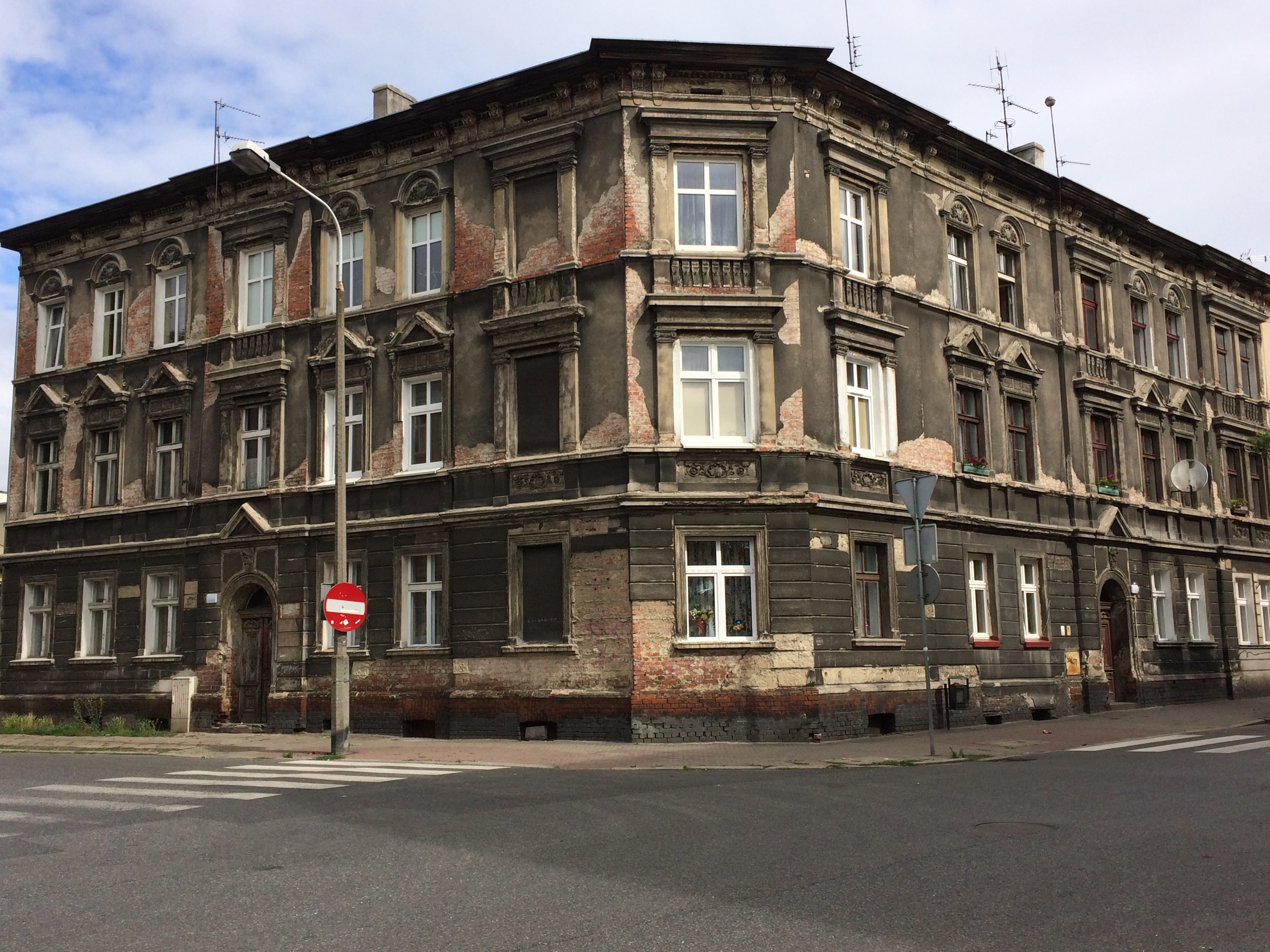
Corner view

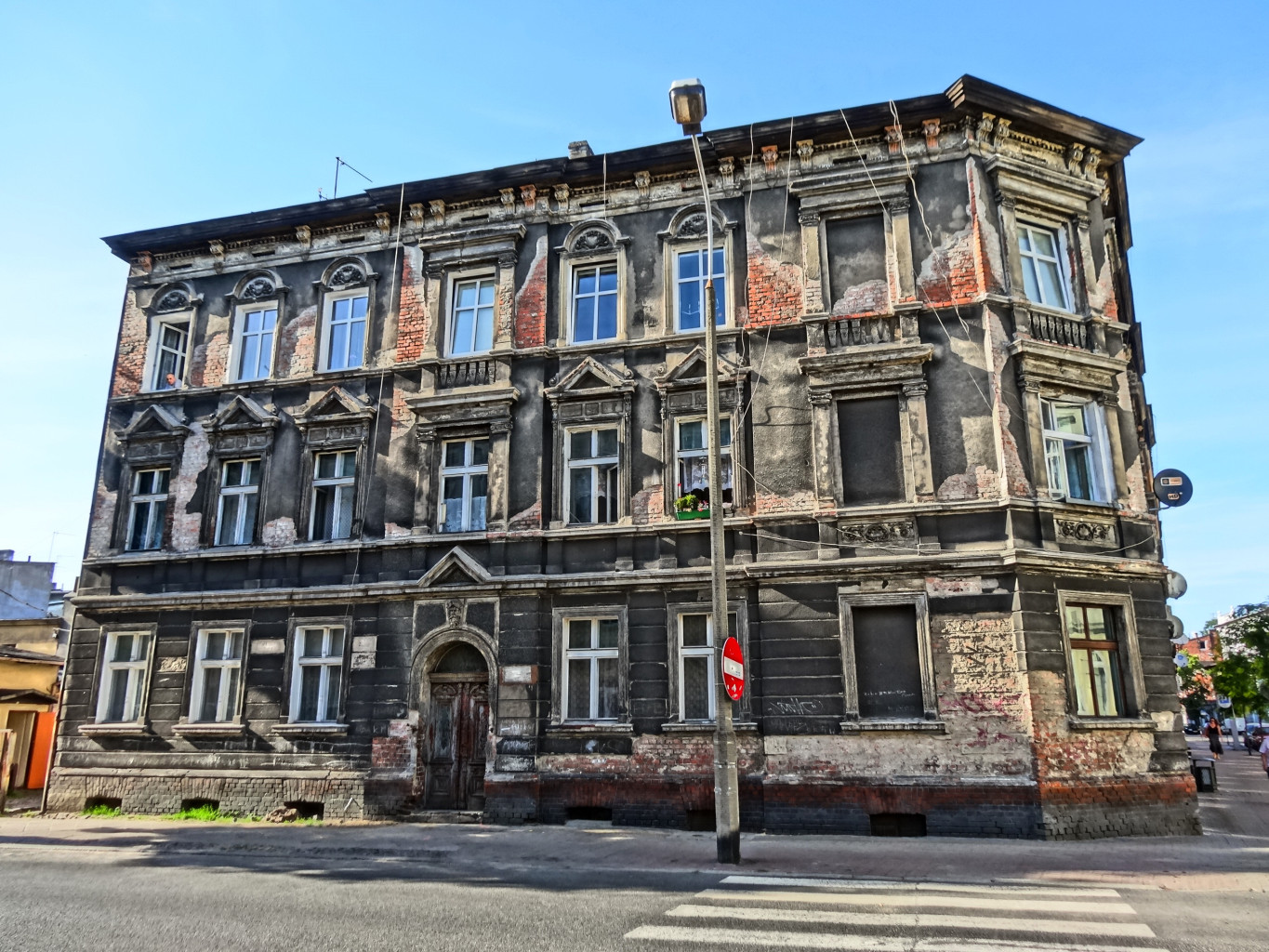
View from Mazowiecka street

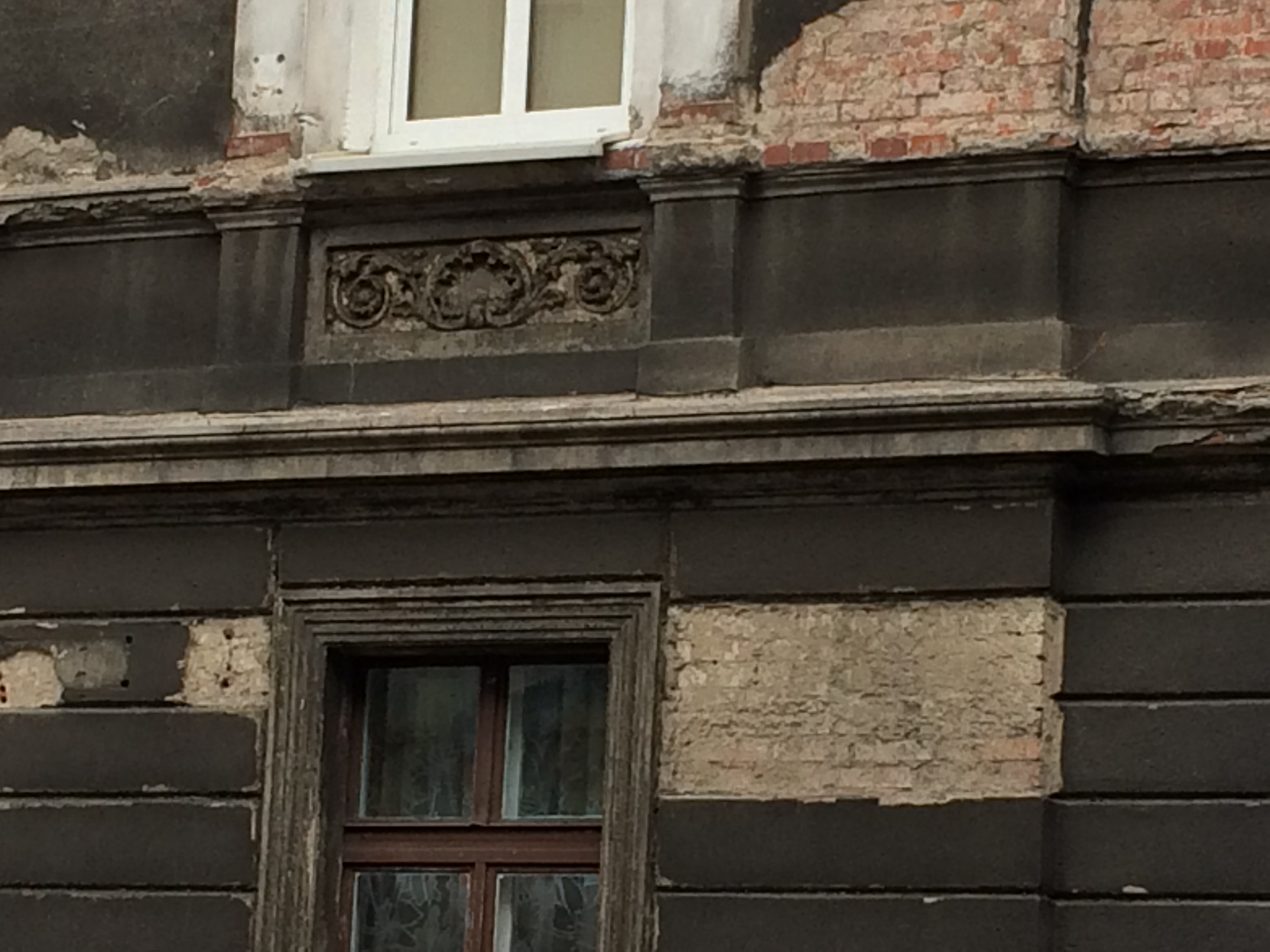
Detail of a cartouche

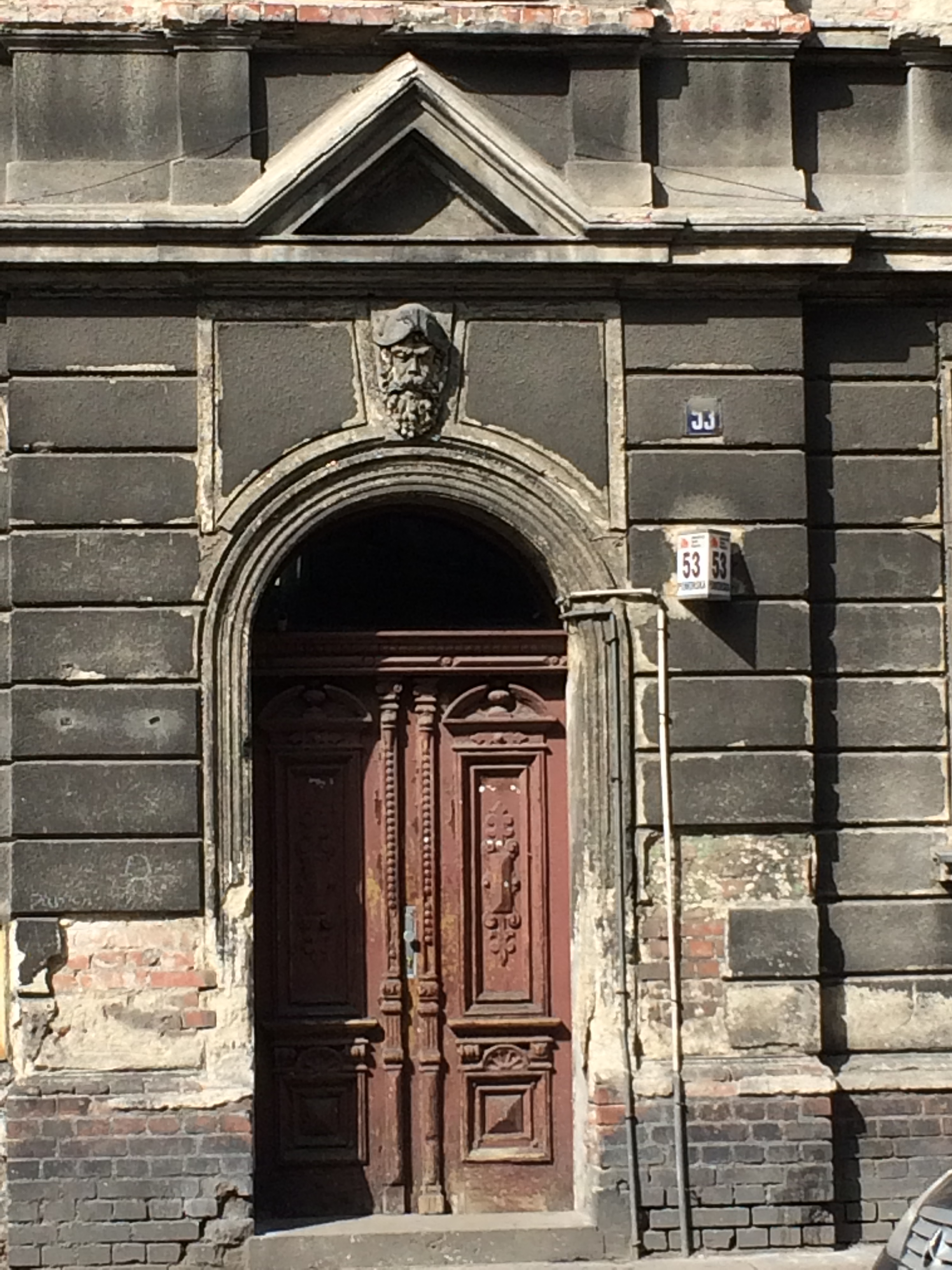
The gate and the overlooking figure

=== Tenement at 1/3 ===
Both frontages display similar eclectic architectural details, with a slight avant-corps dividing them.

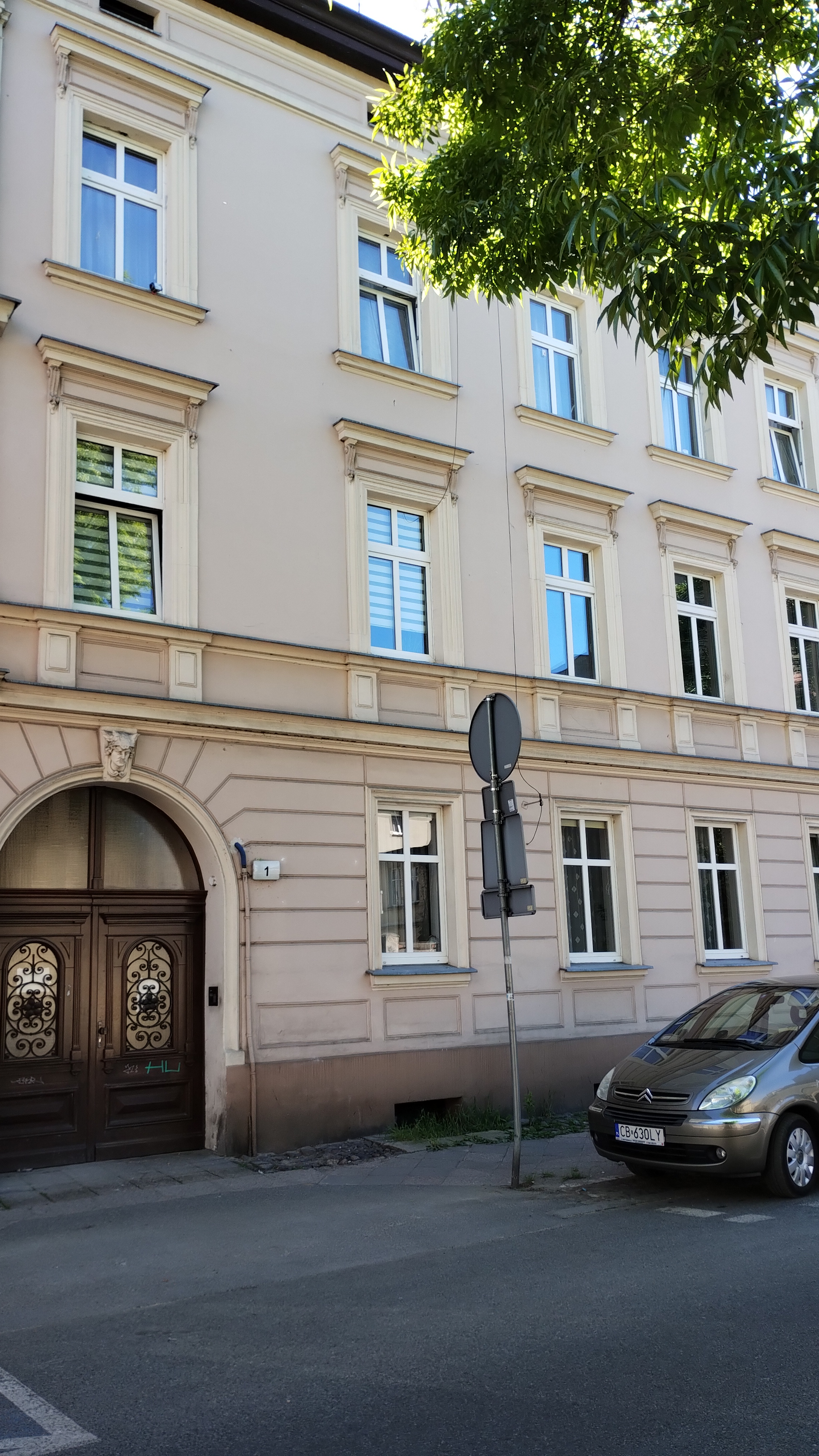
Facade at 1

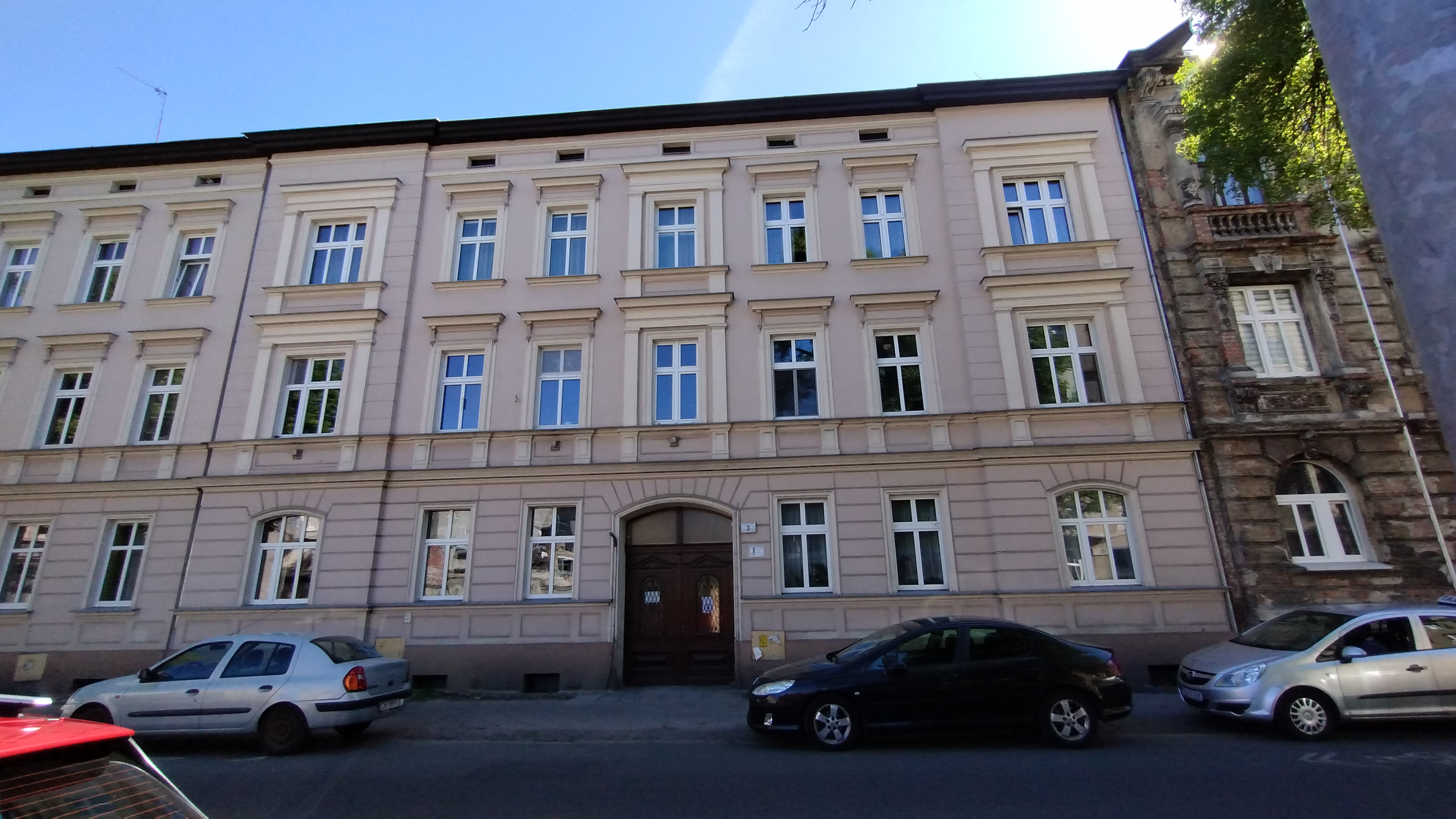
Facade at 3

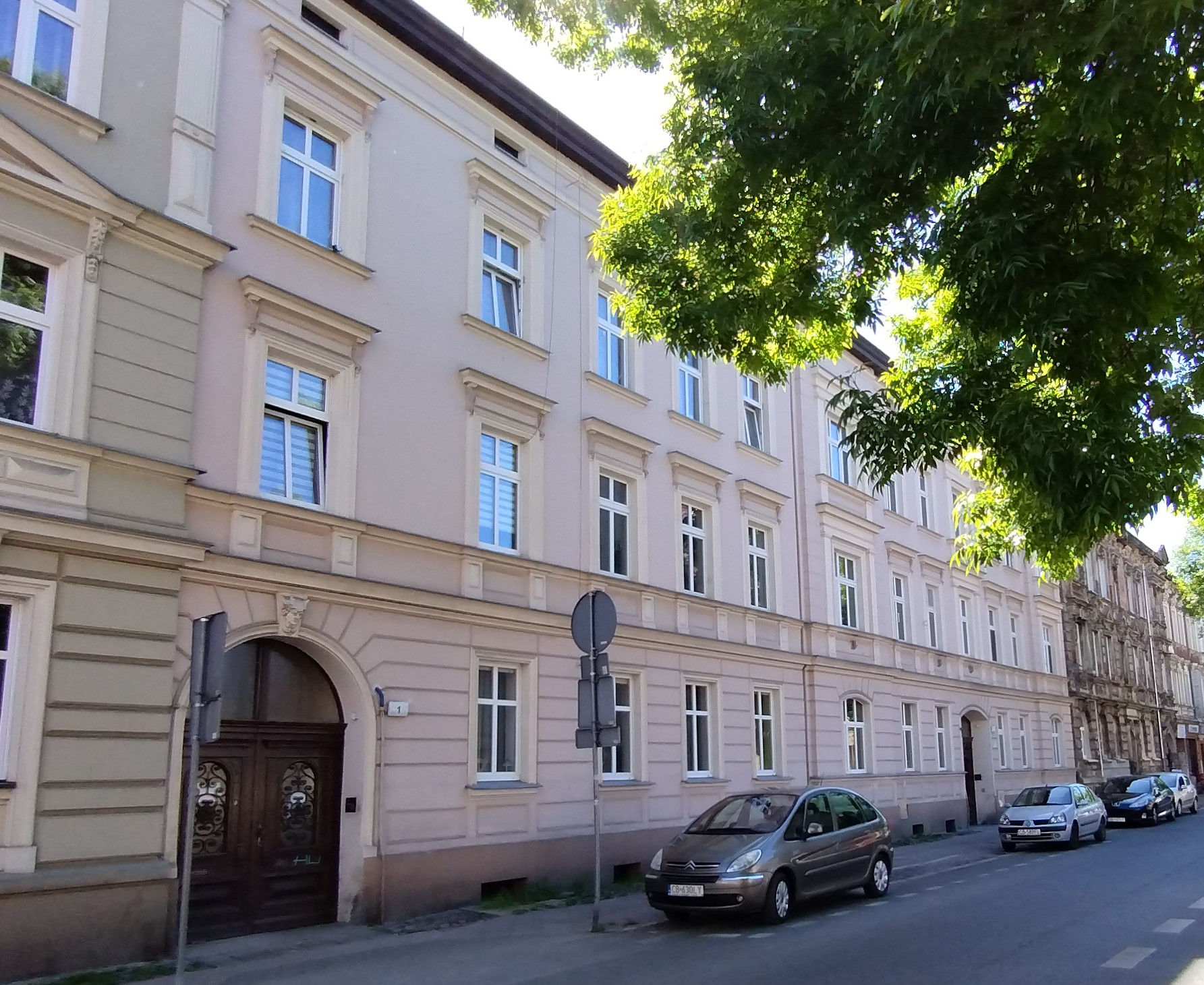
Both facades from the street

=== Tenement at 4 ===
Renovated in 2014, the facade presents characteristics of the first decade of the 20th century with early forms of Modern architecture and Art Nouveau elements: tall bay windows, long vertical lines and a variety of window shapes.

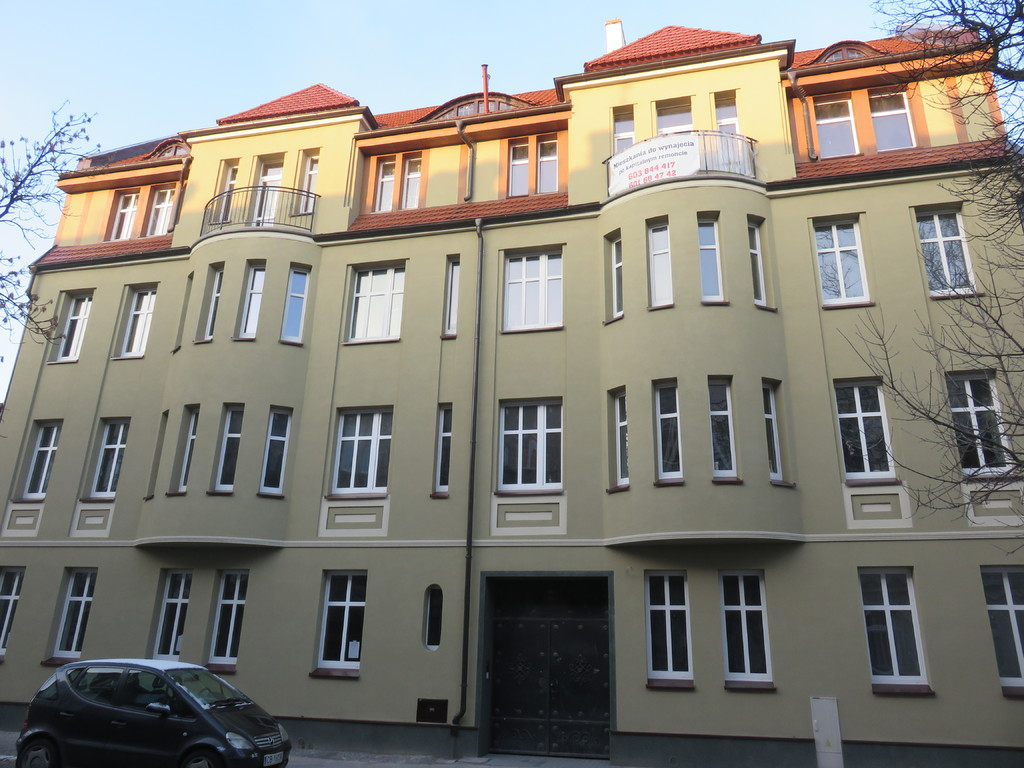
View from the street

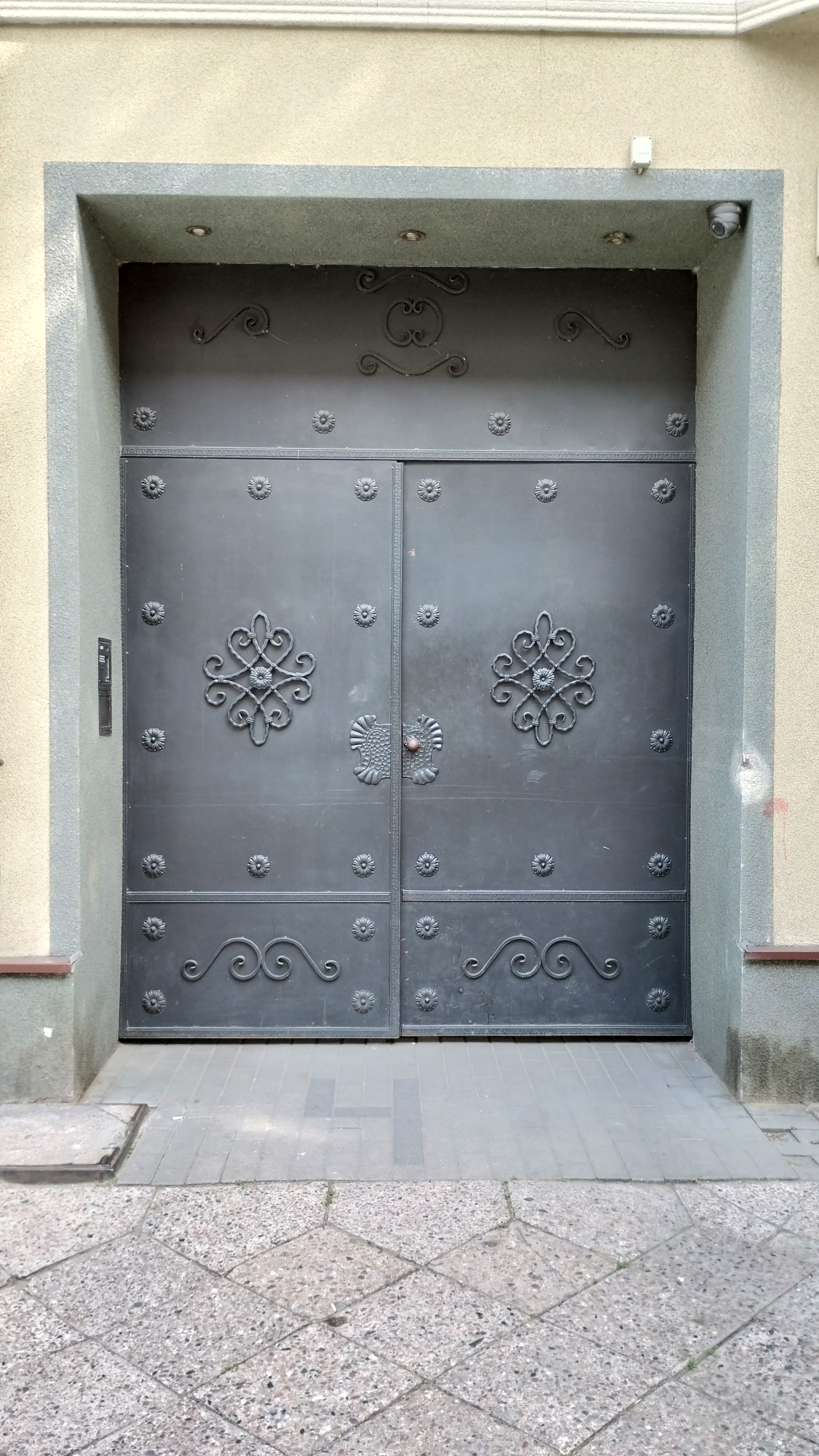
Main entrance door

=== Tenement at 5 ===
The passage to the courtyard has been used by Bydgoszcz-born artist Joanna Rajkowska to create the public project “Thermometers and glasses” (Polish: Termometry i Szklanki) in 2012. Joanna Rajkowska covered the walls and ceiling with a mosaic of mirrors (700 kg of them). The Mirror gate (Brama z luster) has been restored in 2021.

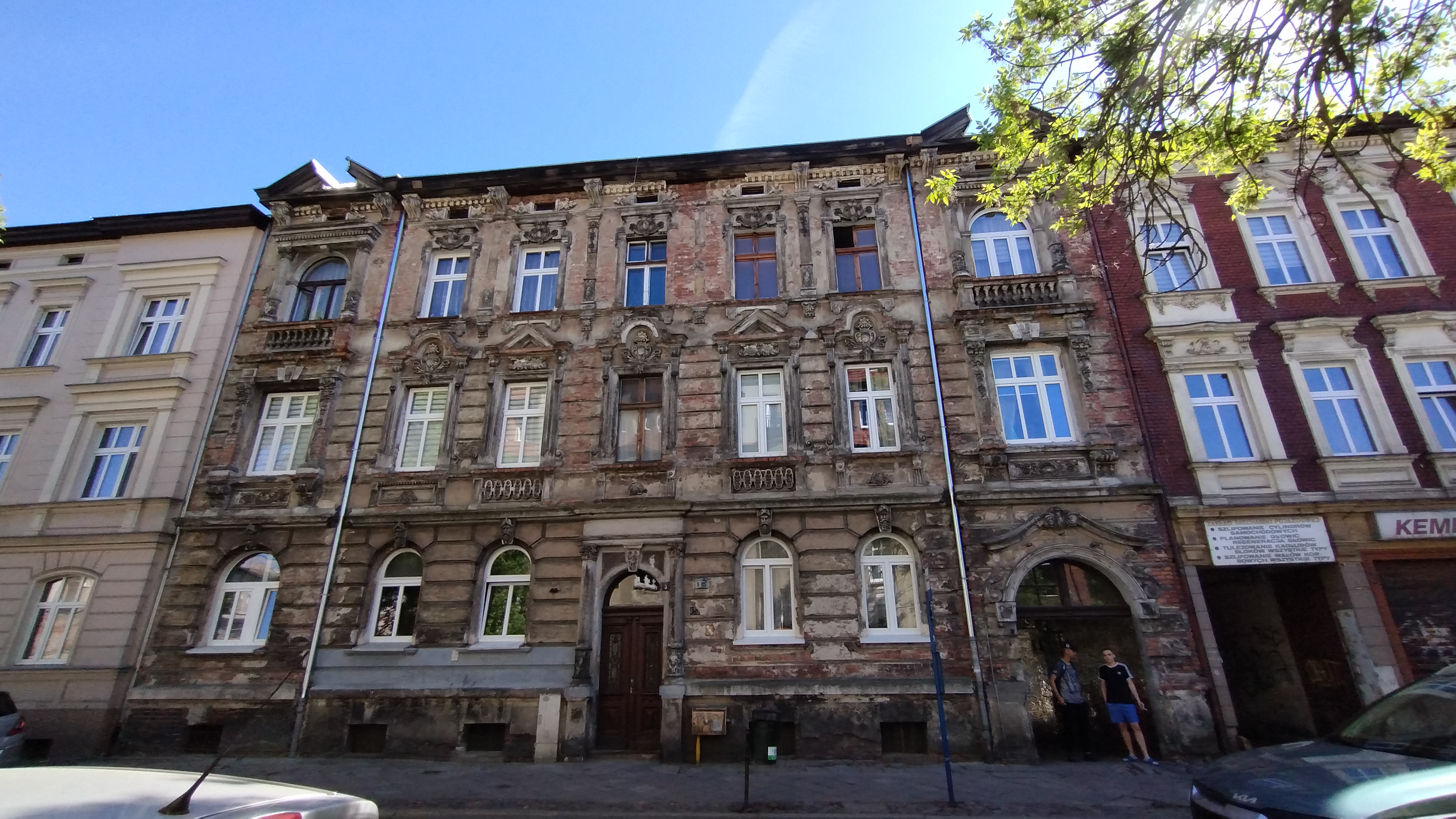
Main frontage onto the street

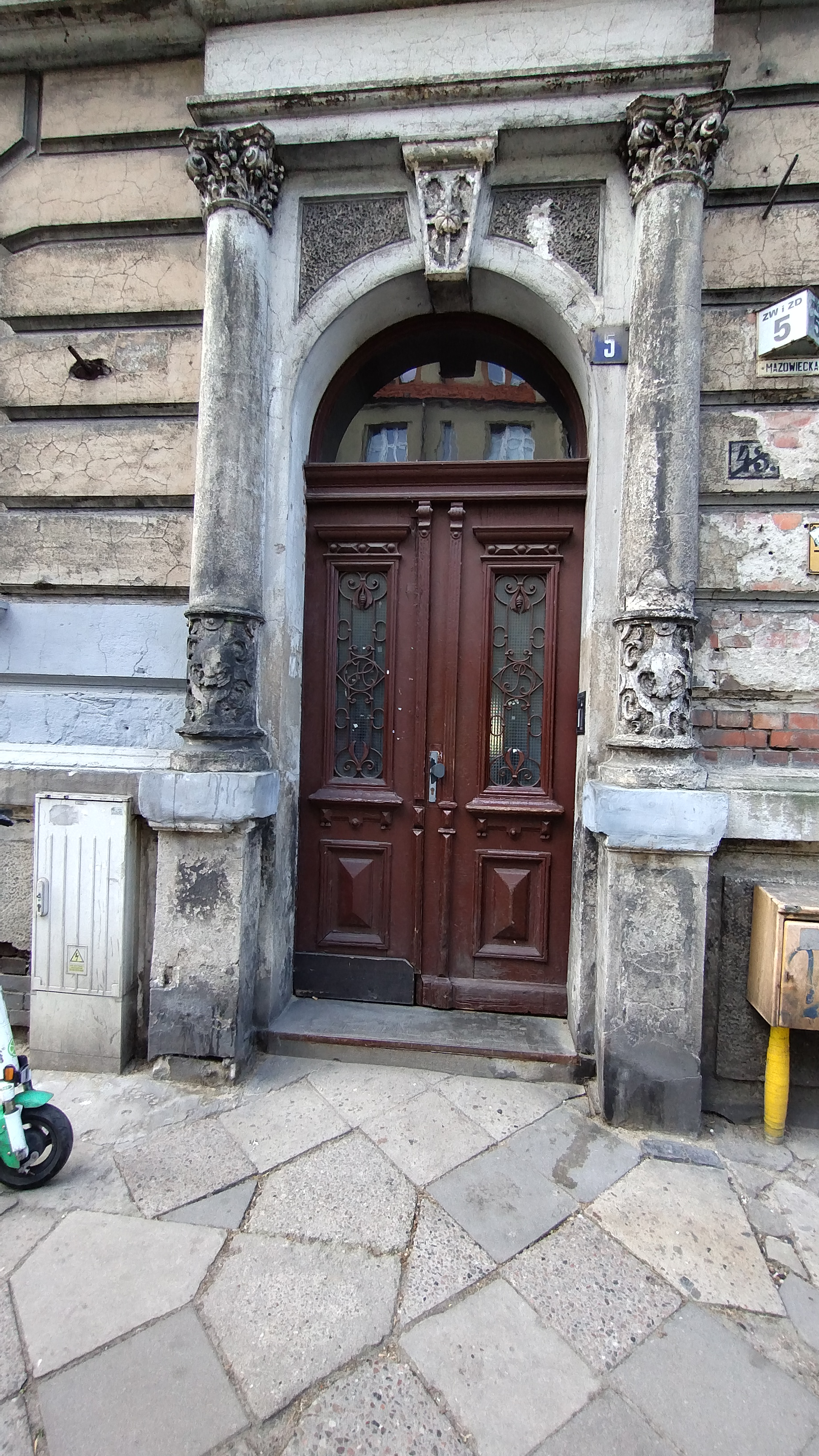
Main entrance door and portal

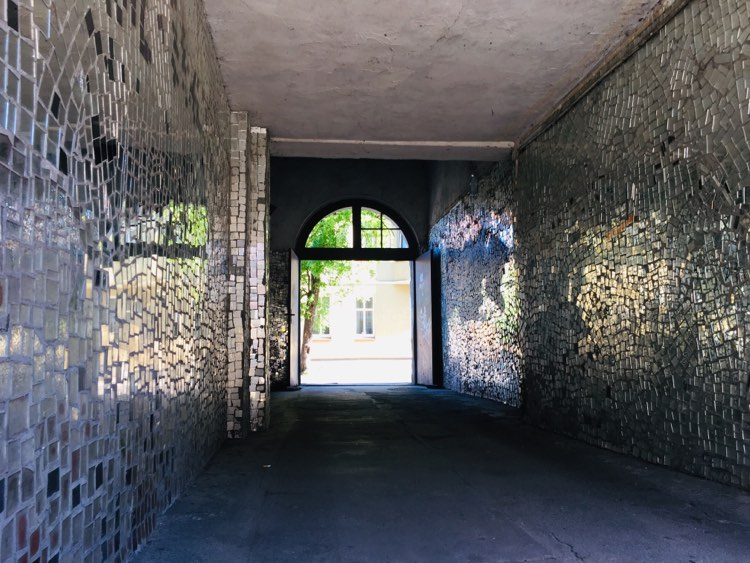
Mirror gate (Brama z luster)

=== Tenements at 7/9 ===
The large facade on the street displays eclectic and neo-baroque architectural details:

- on the ground floor, corinthian style columns and pilasters;
- the upper openings present a mix of columns and adorned pediments;
- the top of the frontage is decorated, among others, with mascarons.
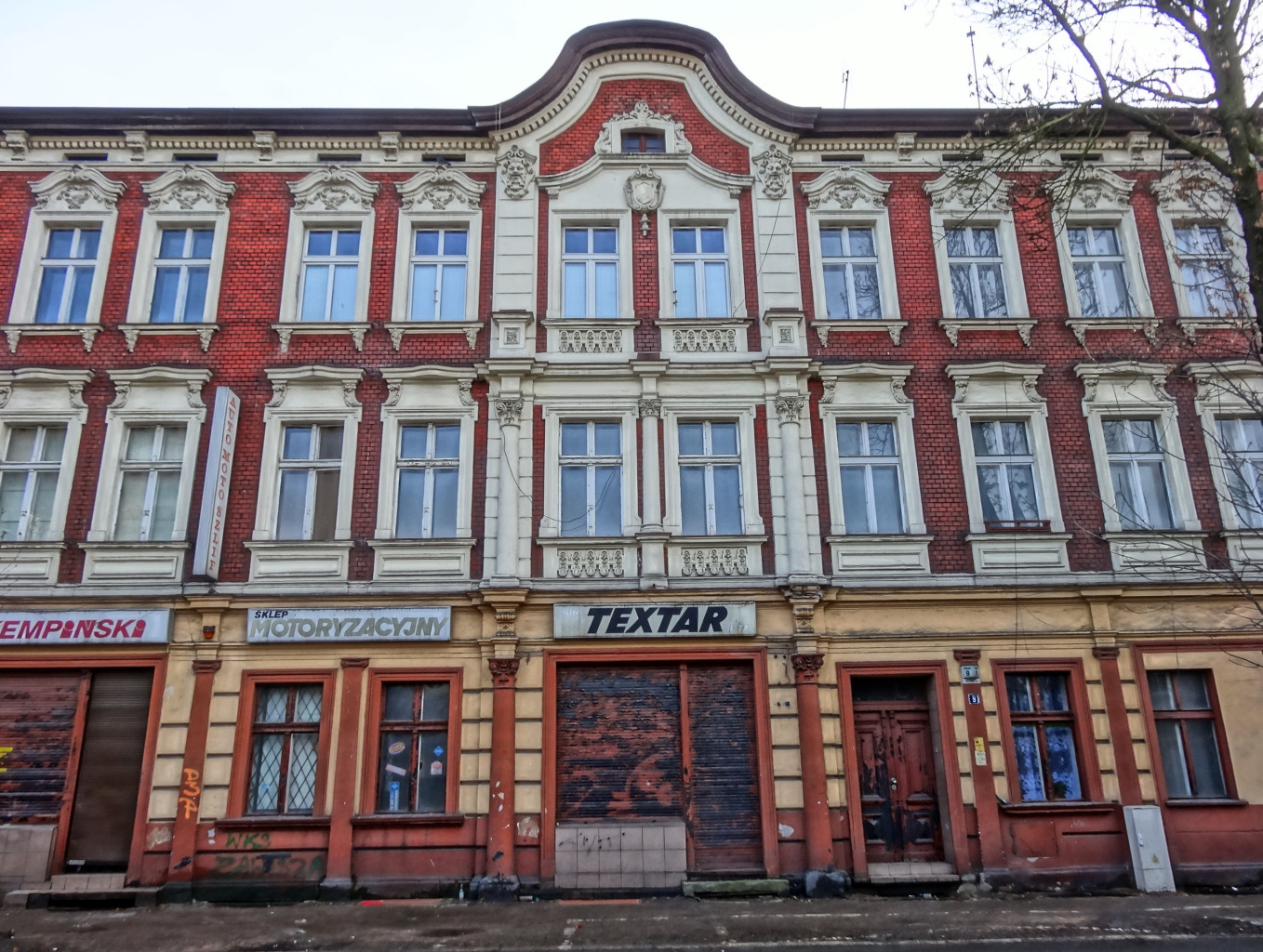
View of the entire frontage

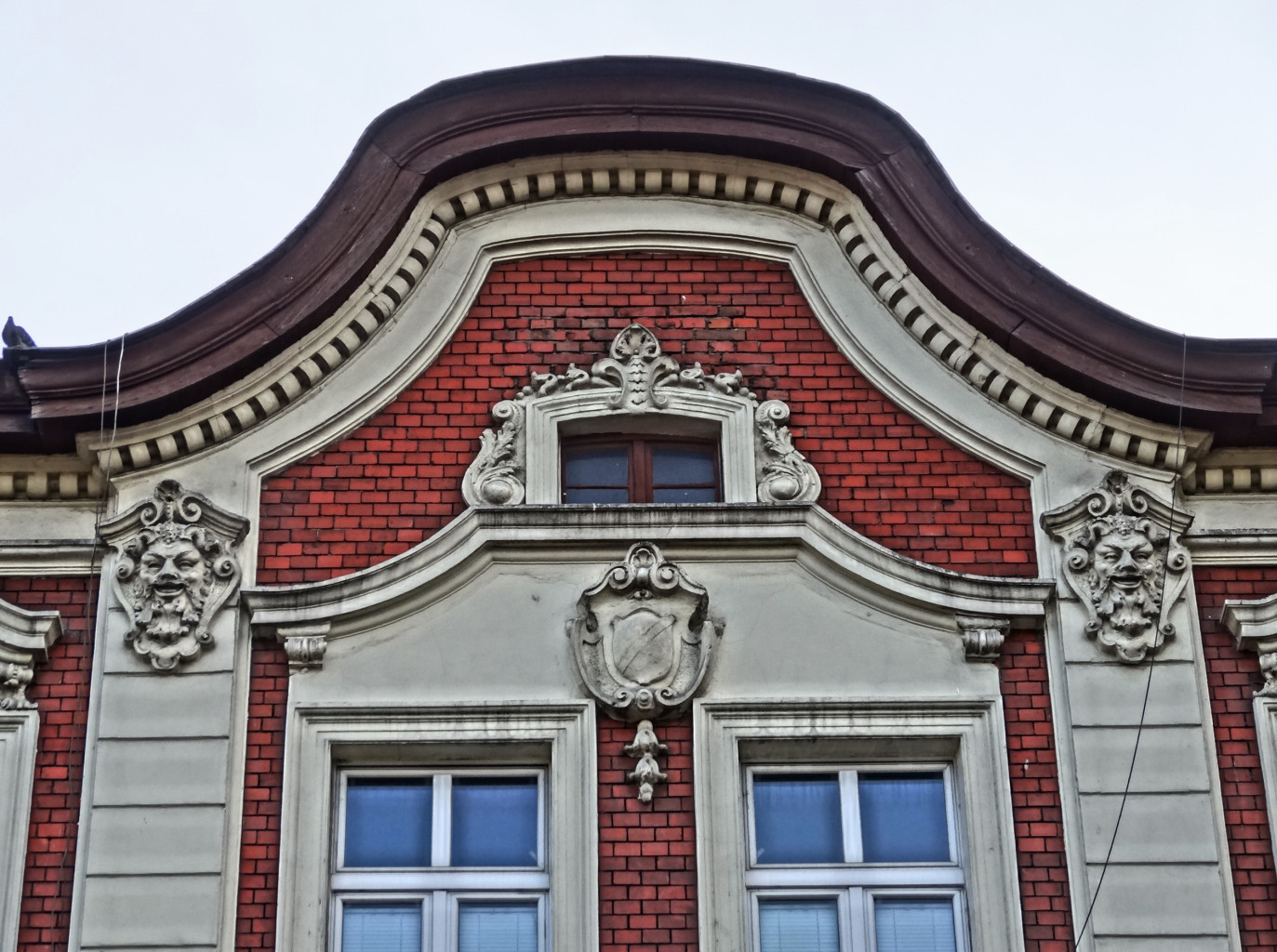
Stuccoe and mascaron details

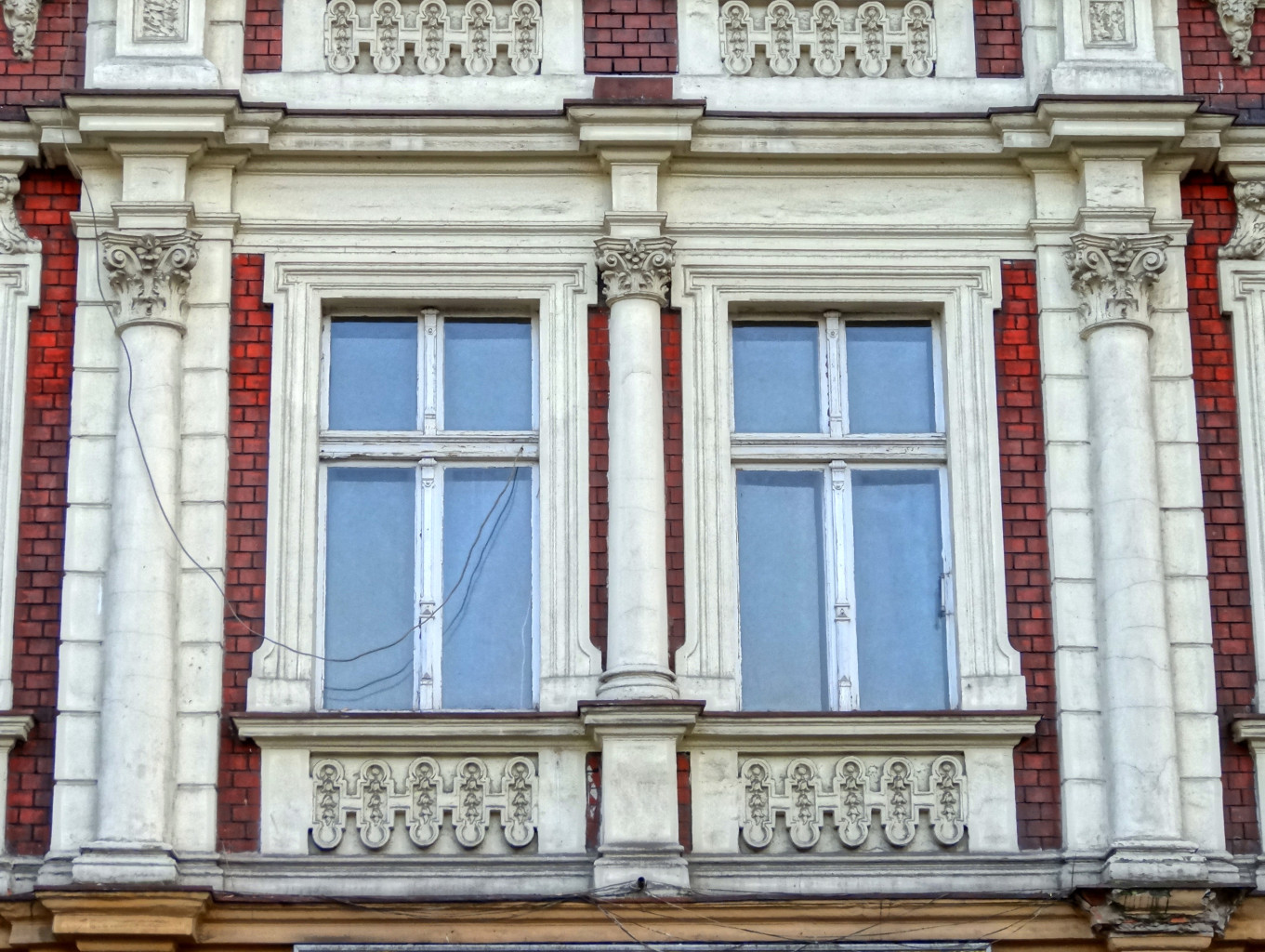
Stuccoe details

=== Tenements at 8/10 ===
These buildings are among the oldest in the street, dating back to the late 1870s. Their first landlord was Anton Czarnecki, who inhabited the house at 8 (then 4/4a Heinestraße).

Both facades lost their architectural details with time. The house at 8 was renovated in 2020.

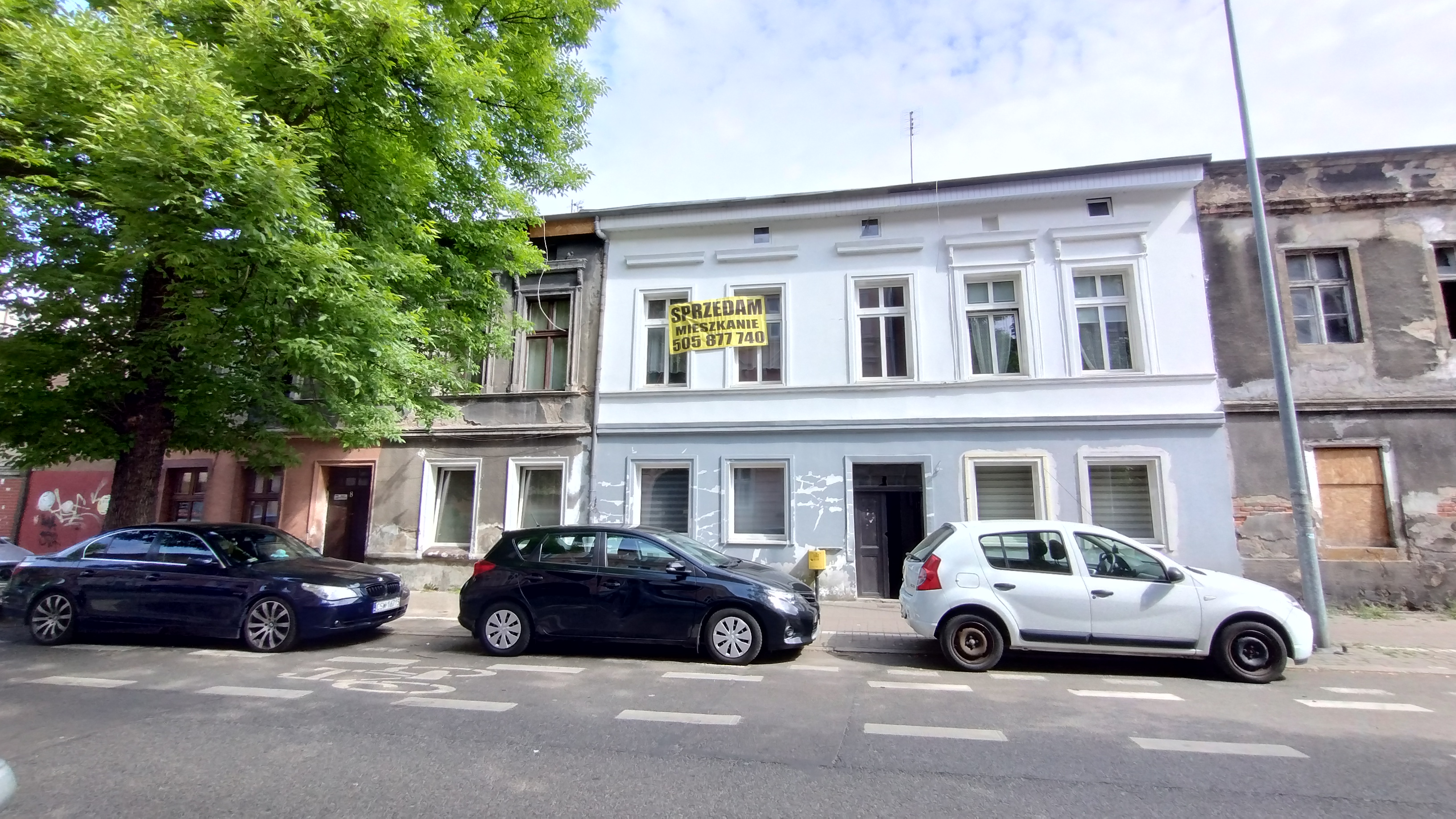
Facade at 8

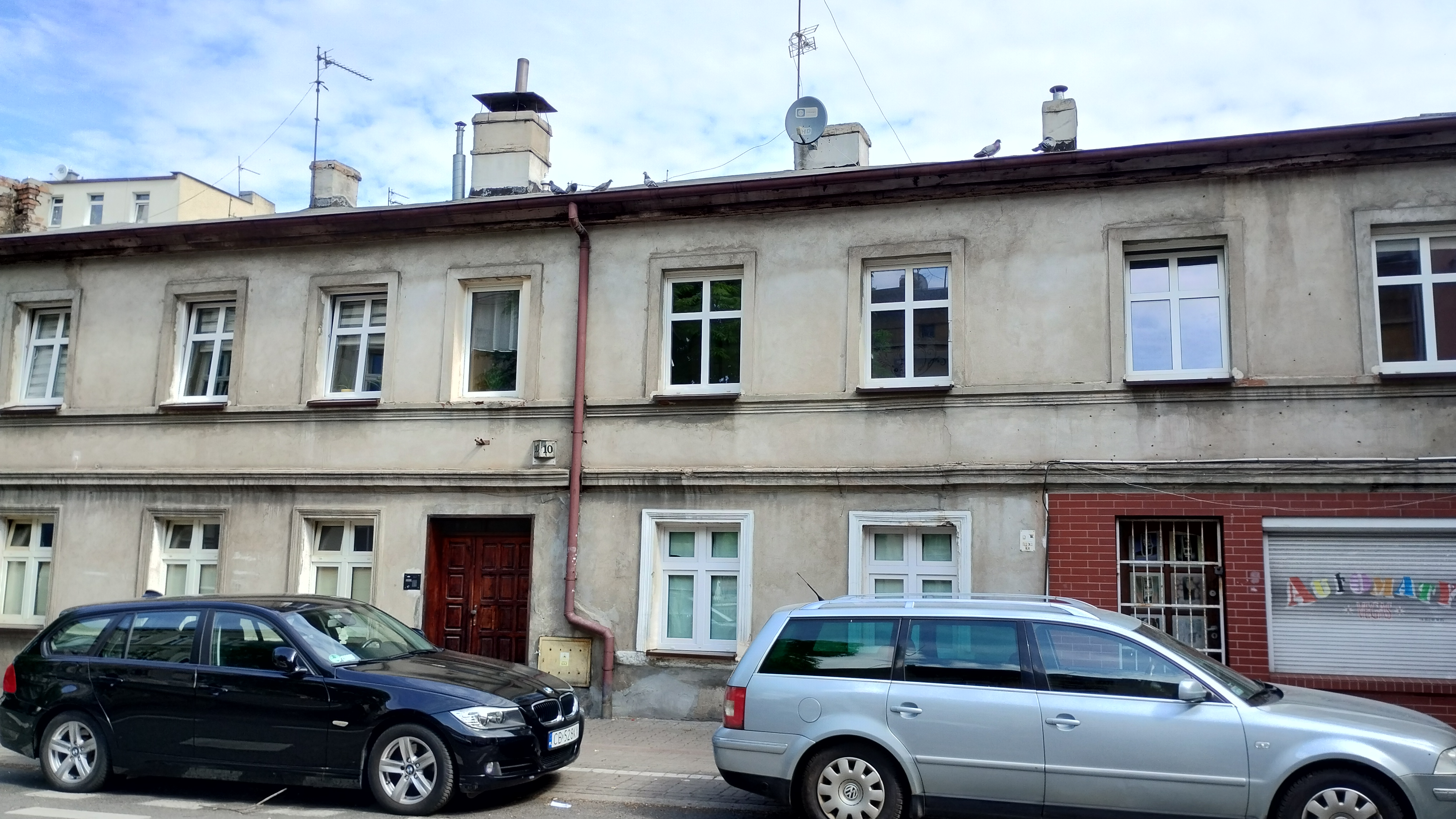
Facade at 10

=== Tenement at 11 ===
The first landlord was Albert Bettyna, a locksmith. Hasan Konopacki (1879–1953) lived there from 1946 to 1953. He was a Lipka Tatar, politician, journalist and military officer, closely connected with the Belarusian national movement. A commemorative plaque has been unveiled on the ground floor of the building.

The facade renovated in 2022 displays eclectic characters: avant-corps, pilasters, stuccoes and top corbel table are worth noticing.

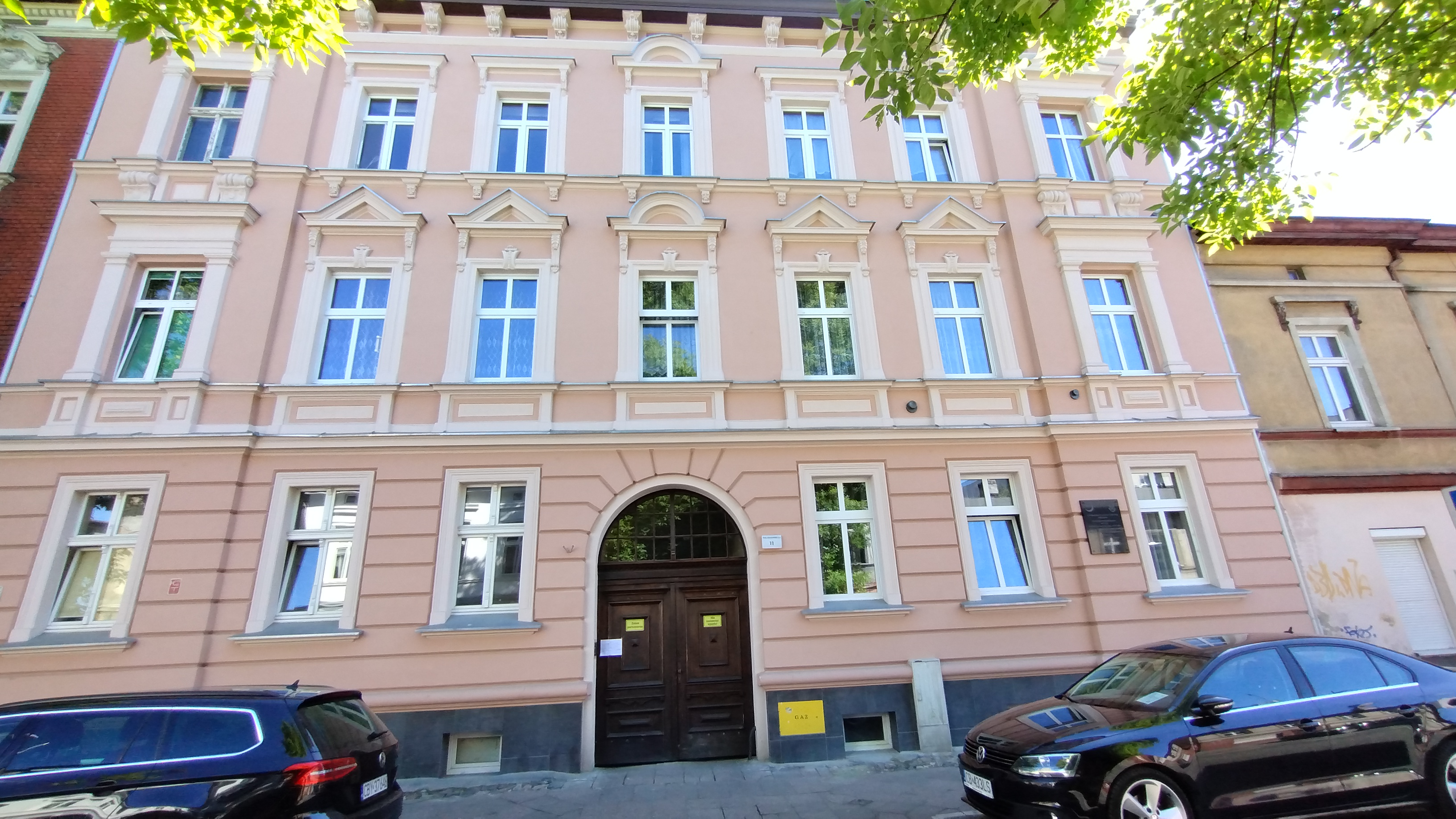
Main facade from the street

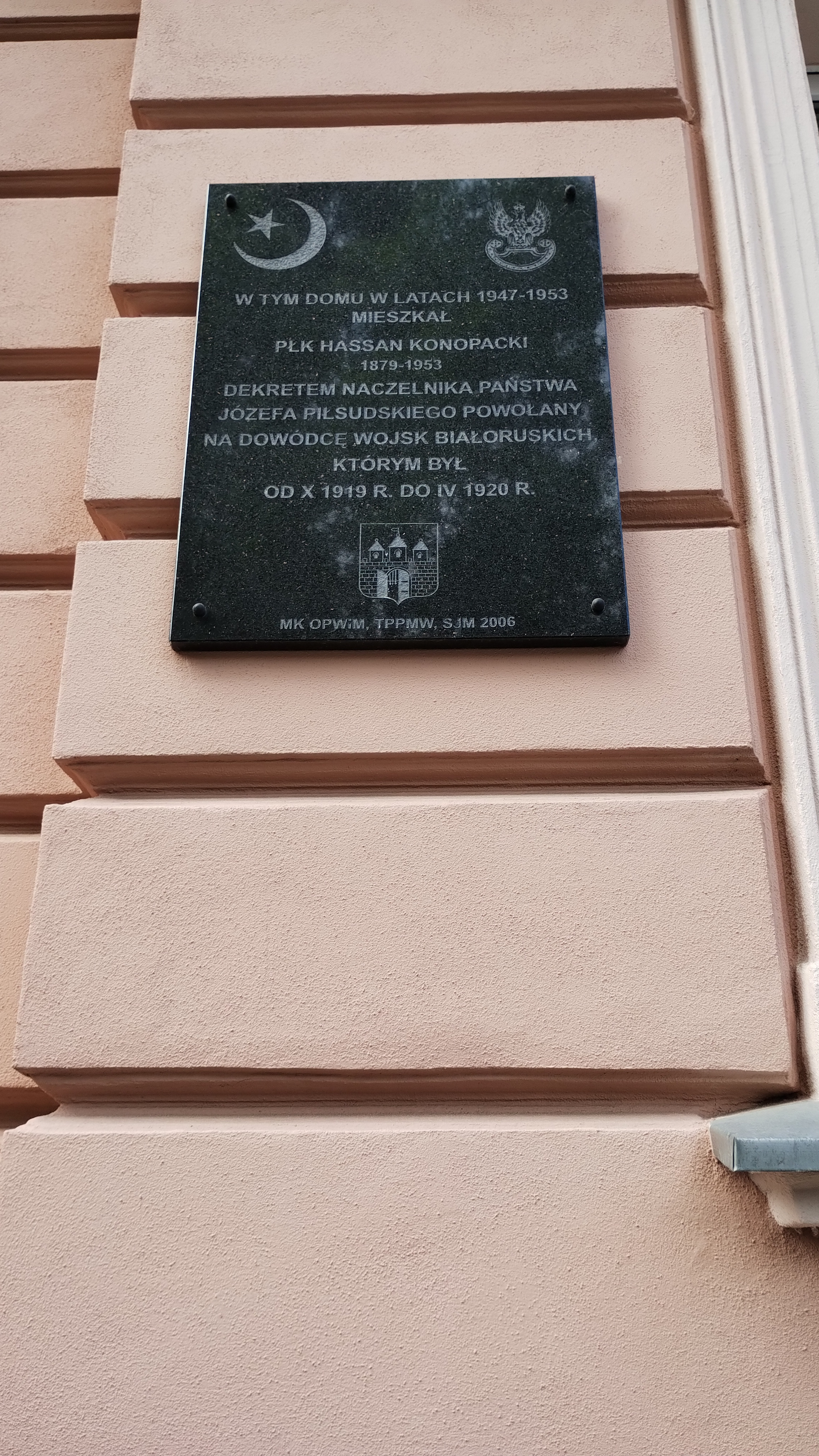
Commemorative plaque to Hasan Konopacki

=== Building at 40 Sienkiewicza Street ===
The house, renovated in the 2010s, exhibits a balcony on the corner narrow facade. There are also stucooed corbels on the window lintel and the corbel table running beneath the roof.

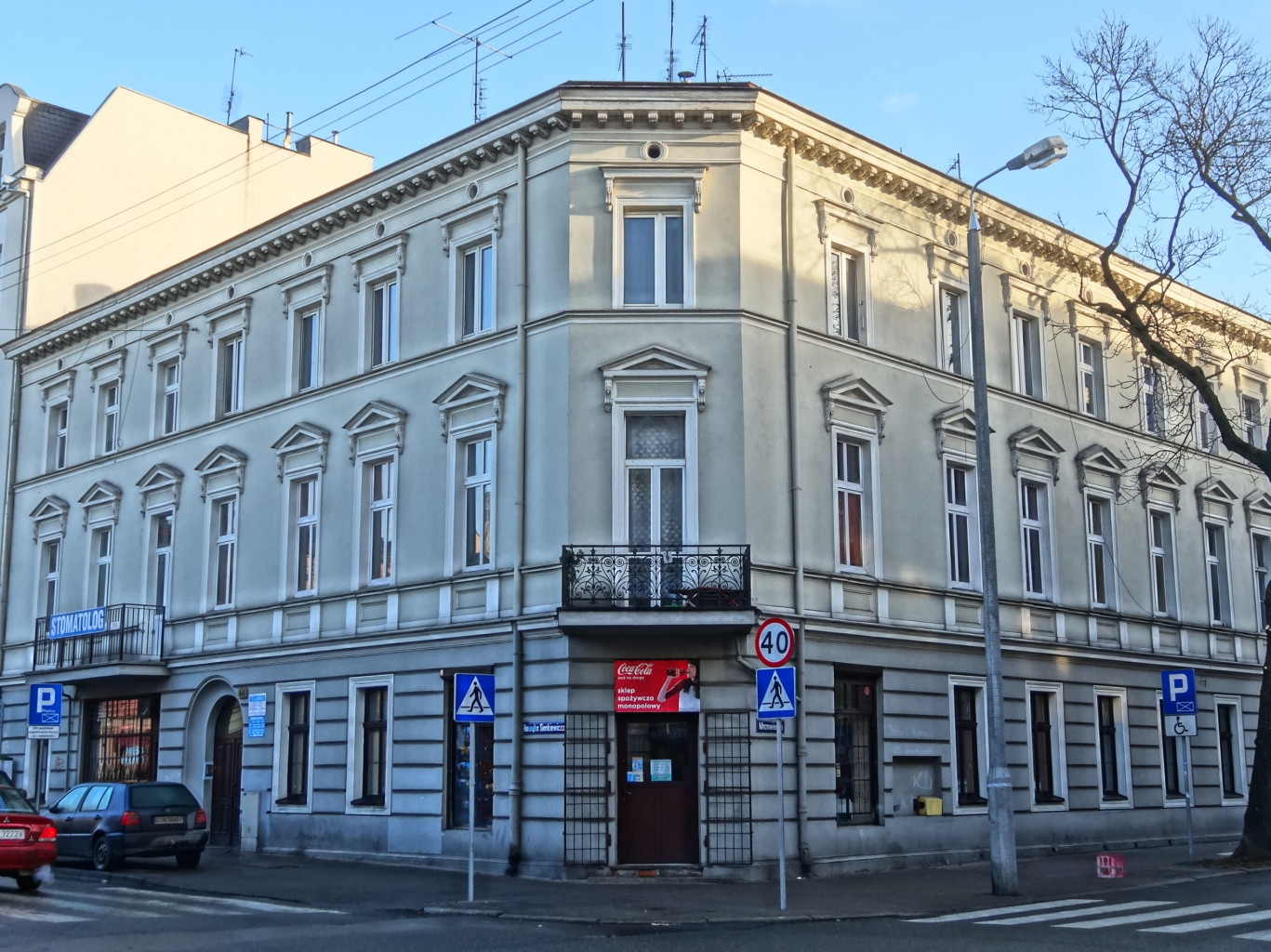
View of both facades

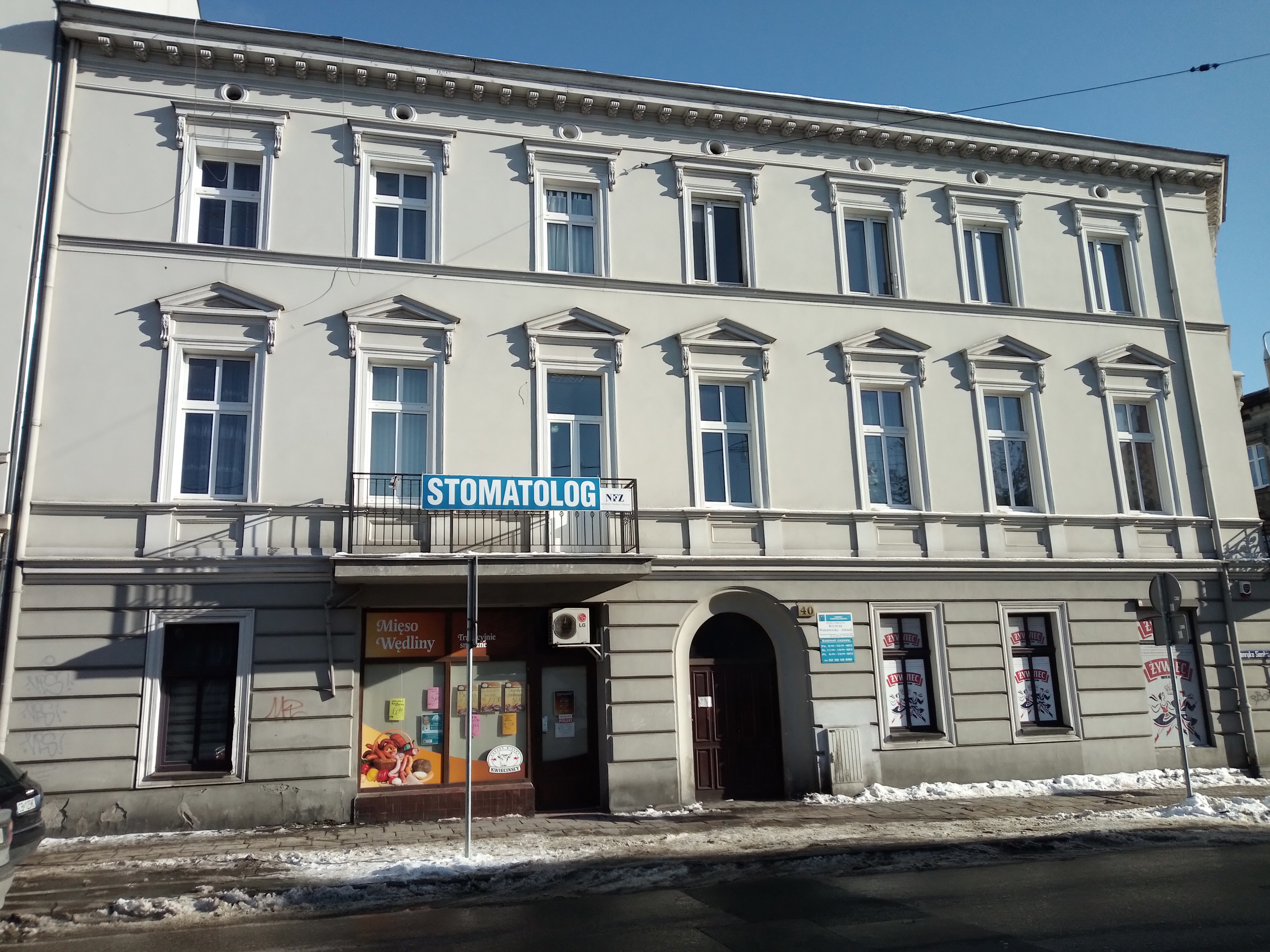
Elevation on Sienkiewicza

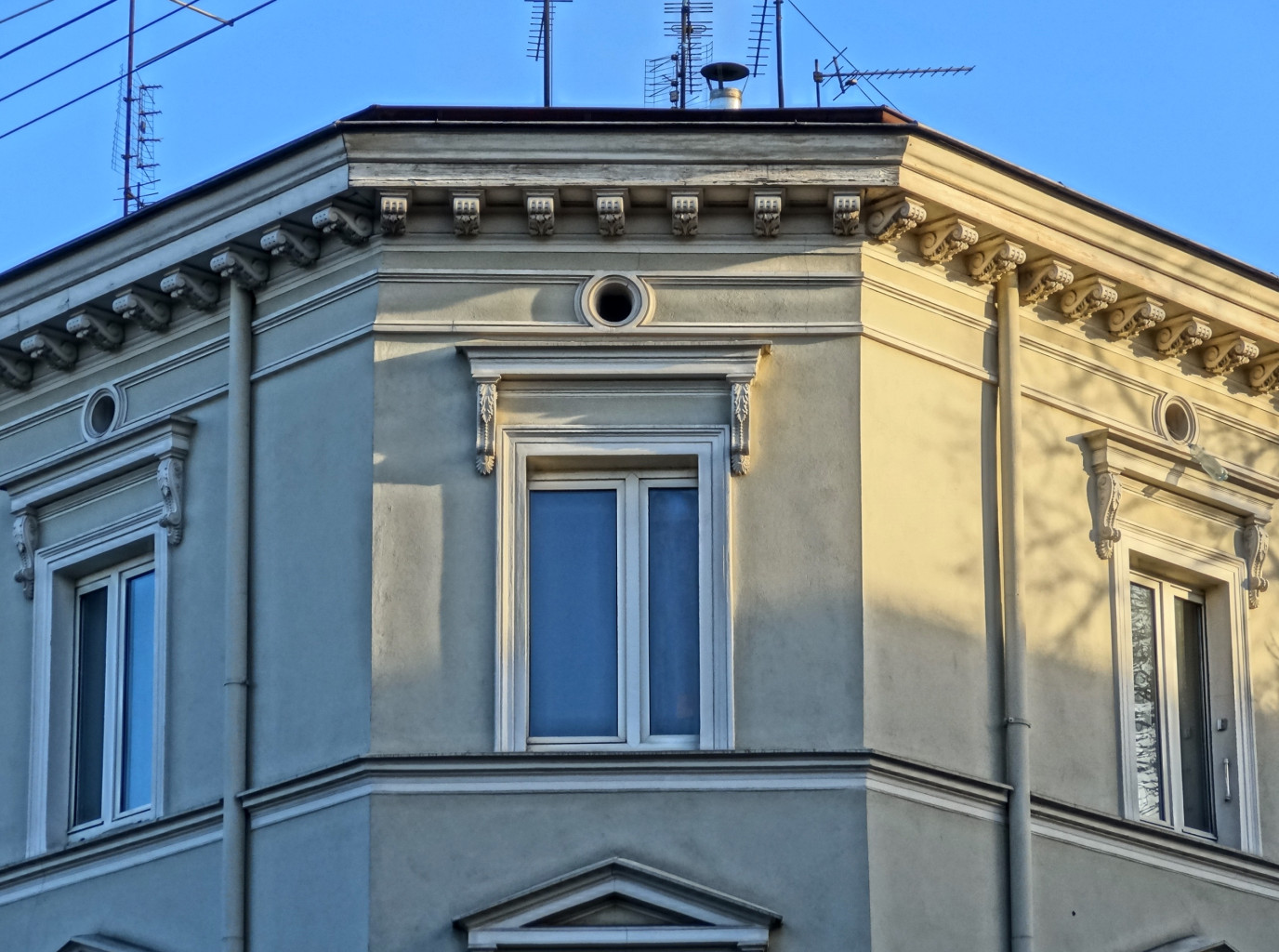
Corbel table

=== Tenement at 14 ===
The most impressive features of the tenement are the two grand balconies on the first and second level. Located above the main entrance, their balustrades are replicated on both sides under each window sills. In addition, window lintels are adorned with festoons, figureheads and mascaron.

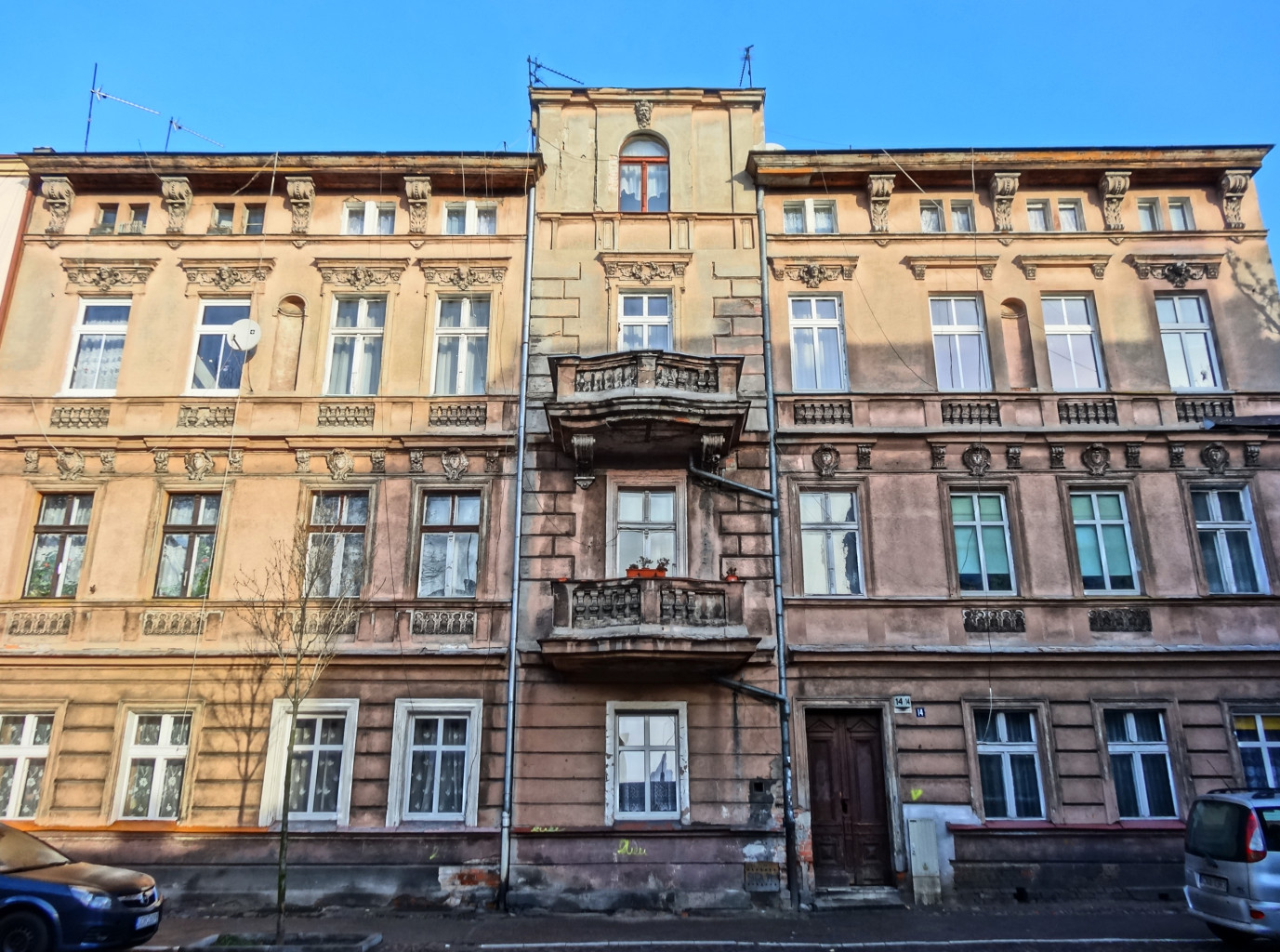
View of the main frontage

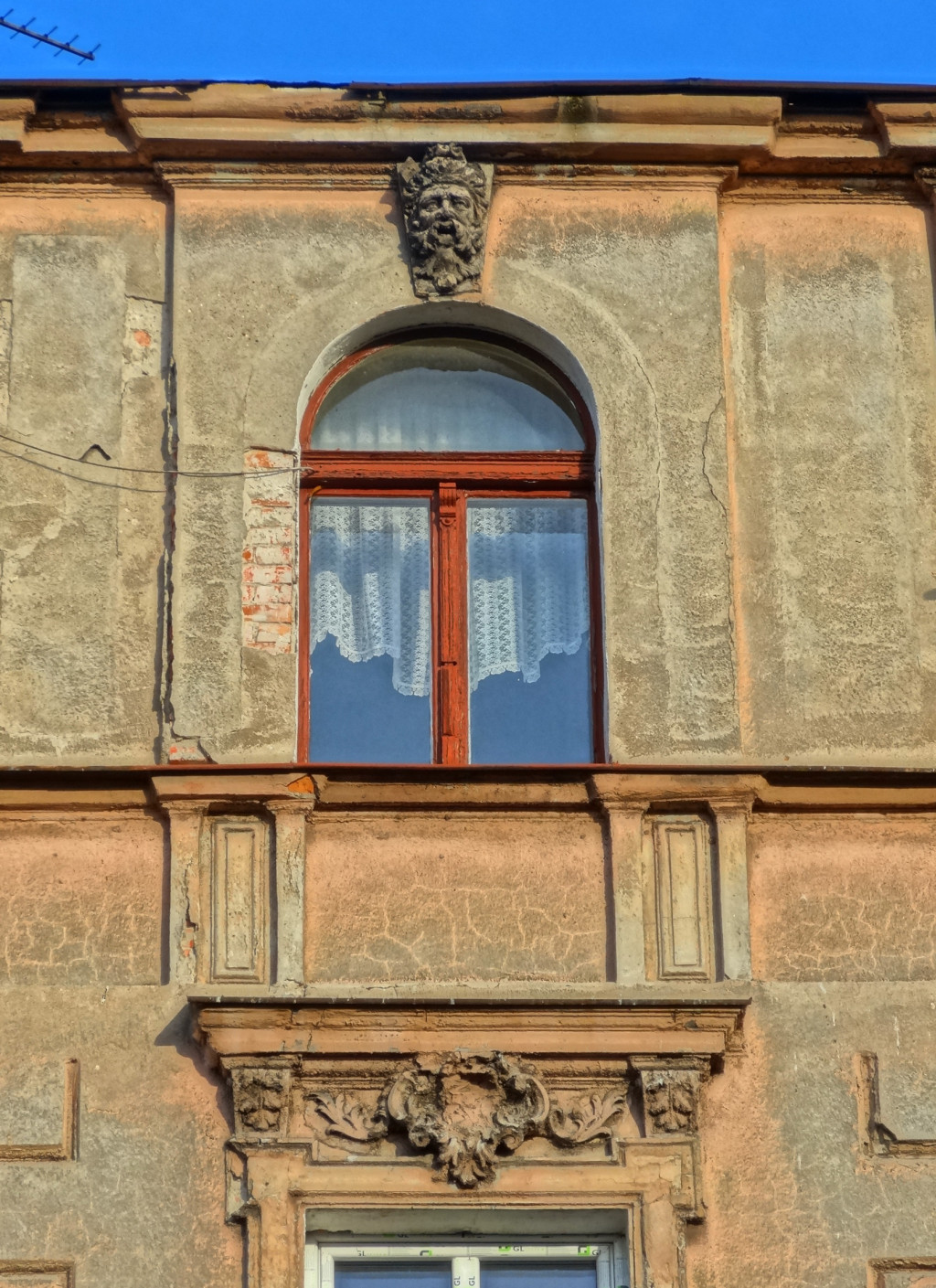
Top window

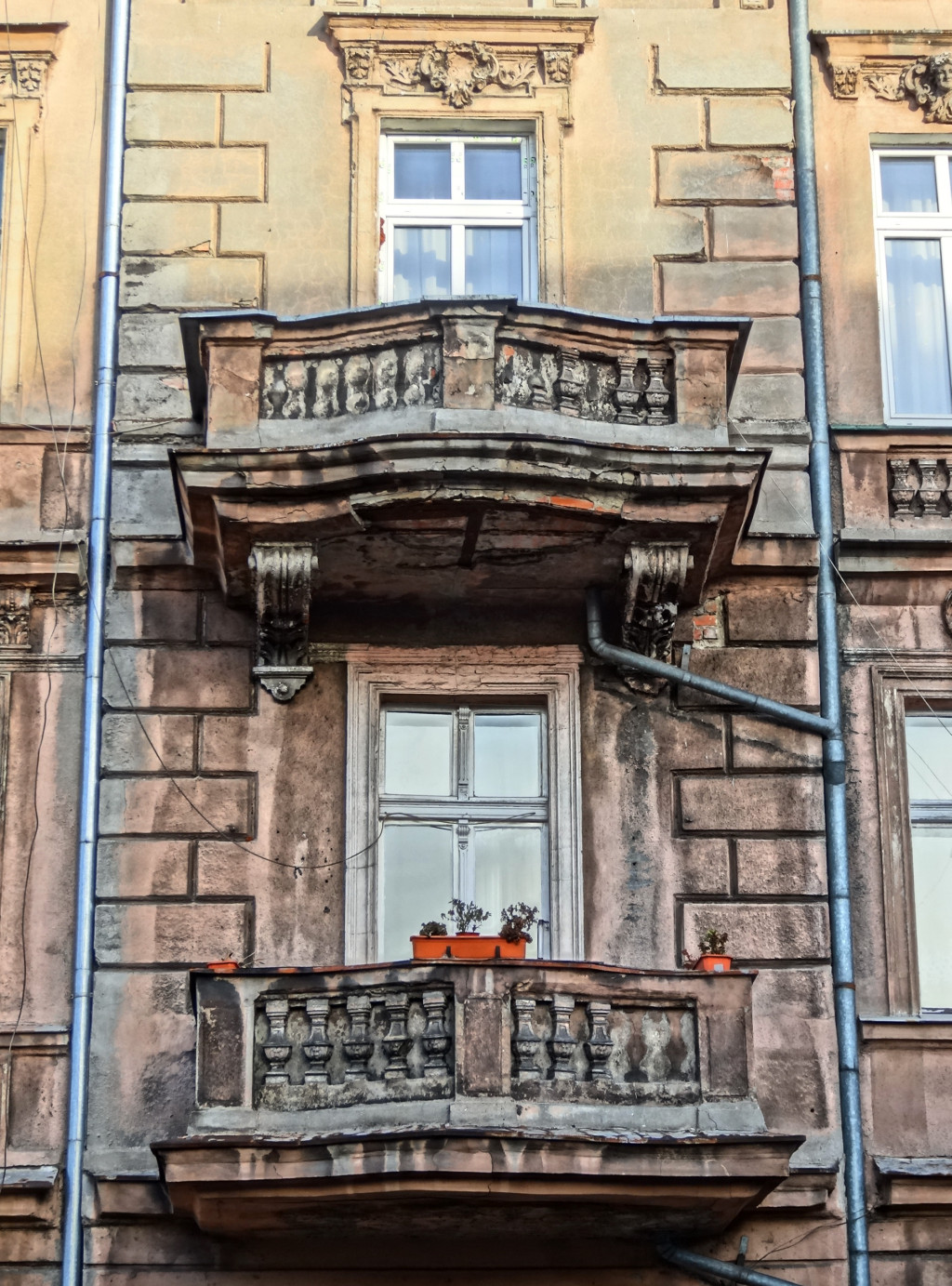
grand balconies

=== Tenement at 15 ===
The recent renovation (2022) recalls that at the time of construction, it was one of the most impressive tenement houses on the street, especially with its large double entrance door which round transom light decorated with figures of flying angels.

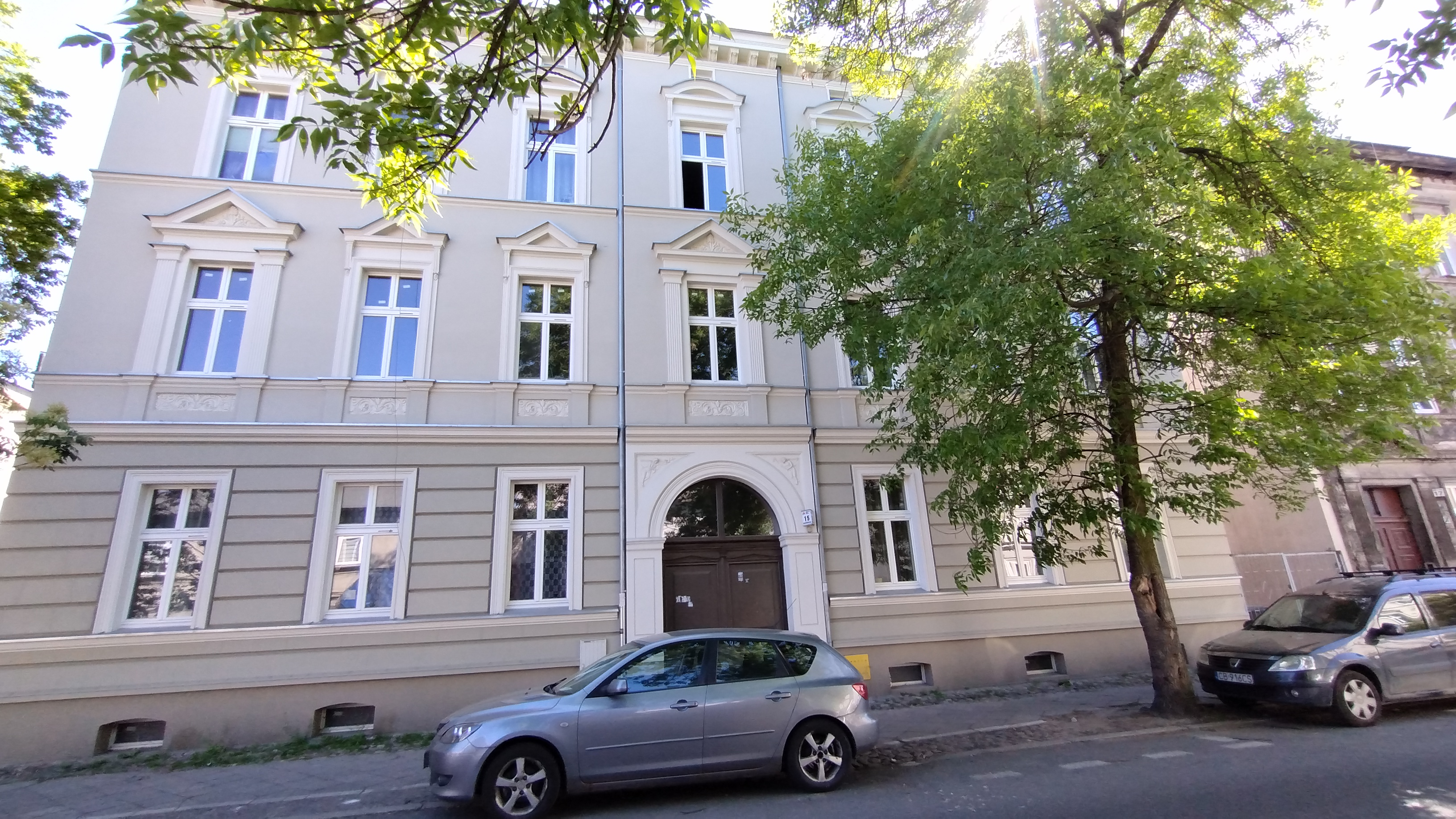
Facade onto the street

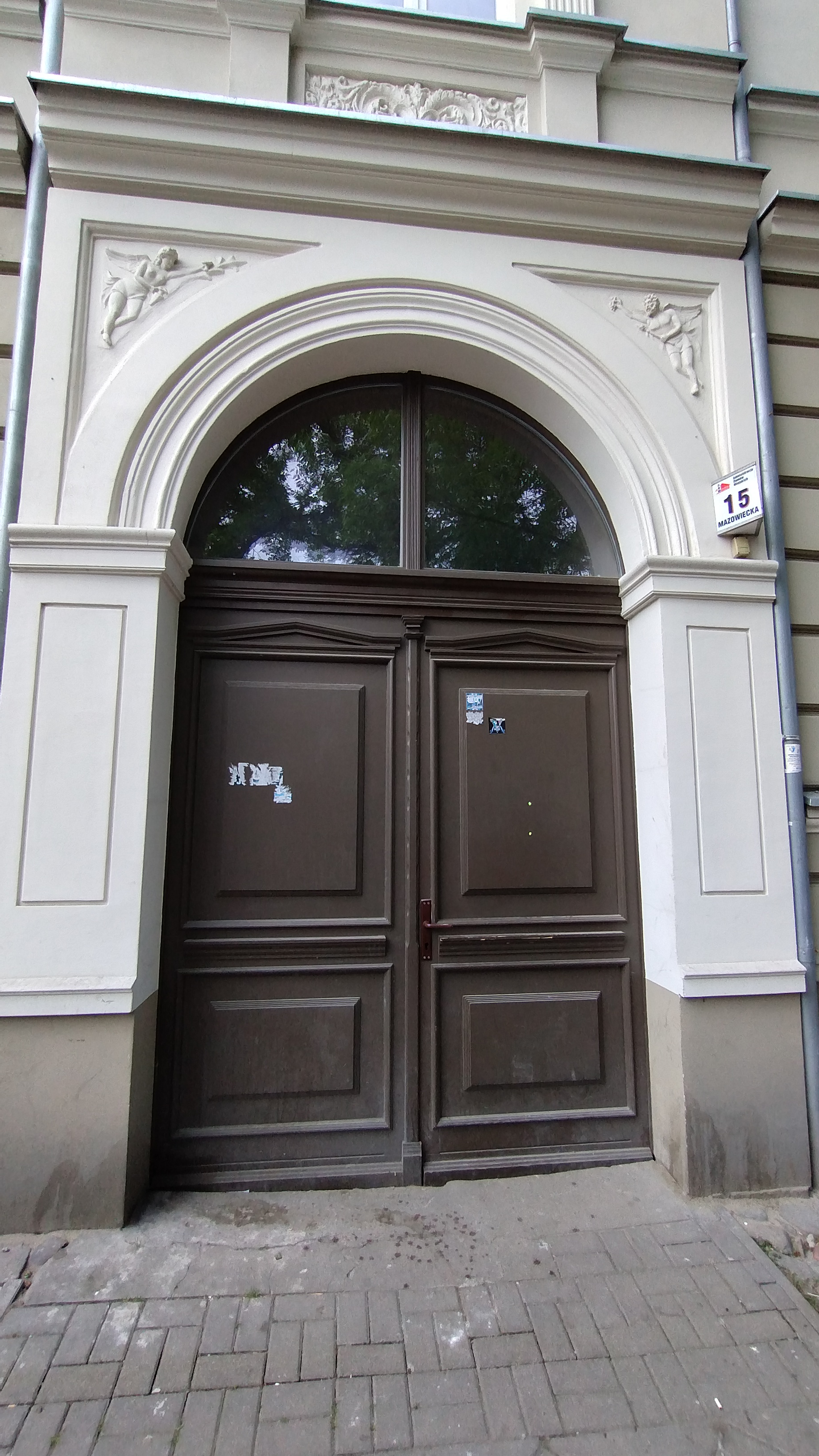
Adorned portal

=== Building at 17, corner with 38 Sienkiewicza Street ===
The corner building, in need of restoration, still possesses entrance door decoration, with pilasters flanking the side and a triangular pediment filled with plastered floral motifs and a smiling figure head. This ensemble is replicated on the door opening on Mazowiecka street.

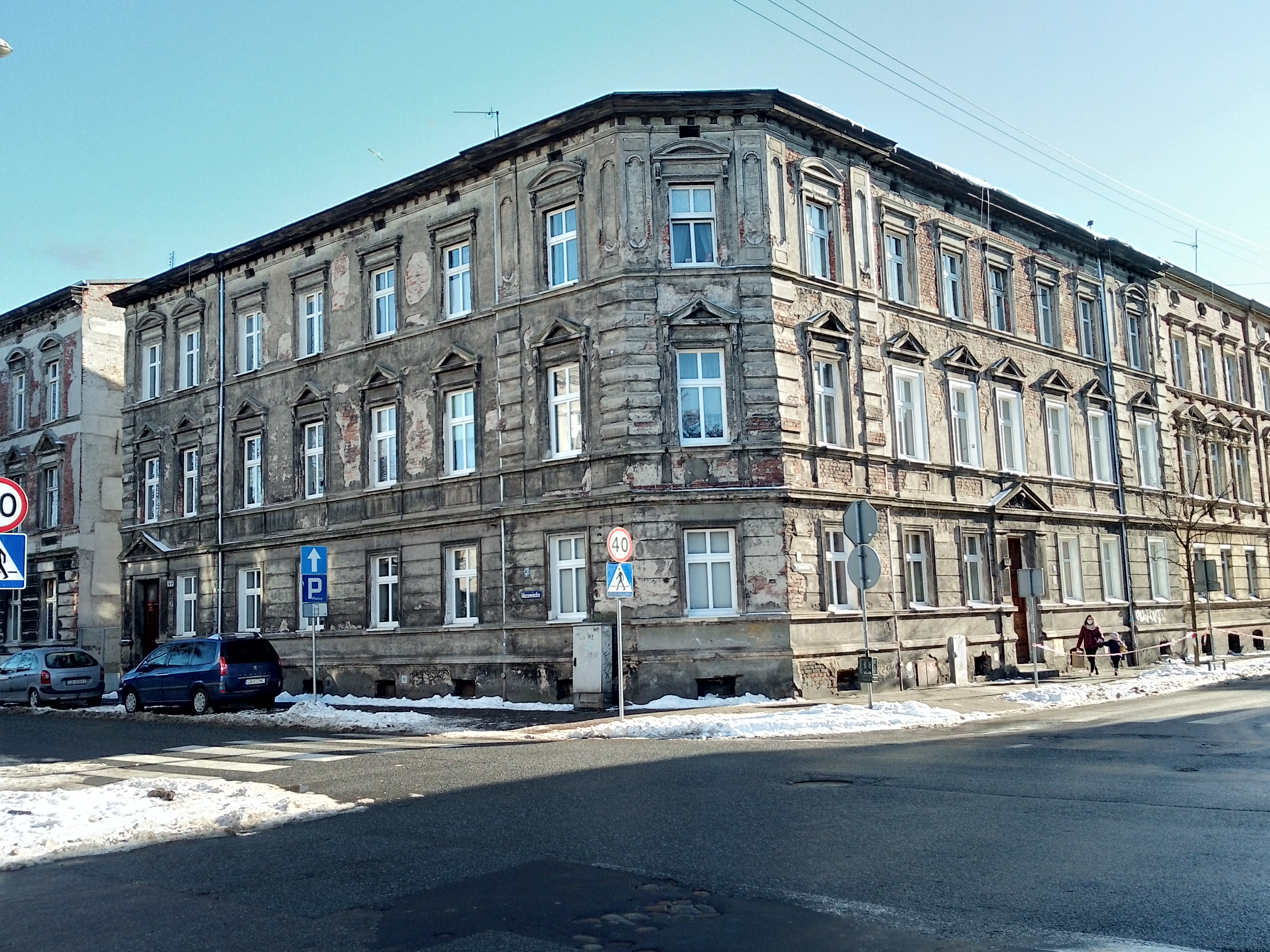
View of both facades

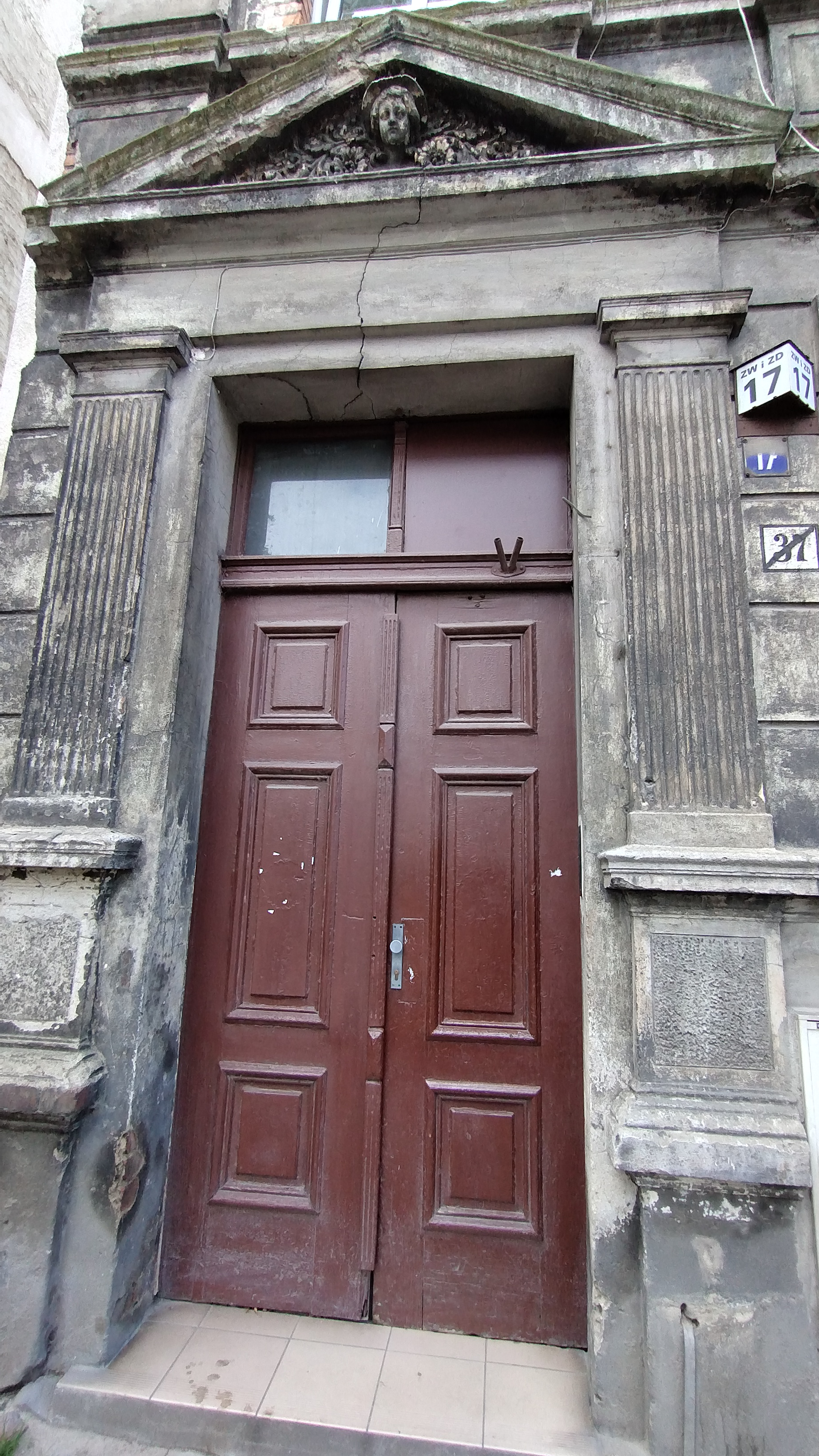
Main door and portal, with the ancient street numbering (37)

=== Tenement at 18 ===
Although the facade decoration is now gone, one can still appreciate the four balconies, fenced with floral-shaped wrought iron.

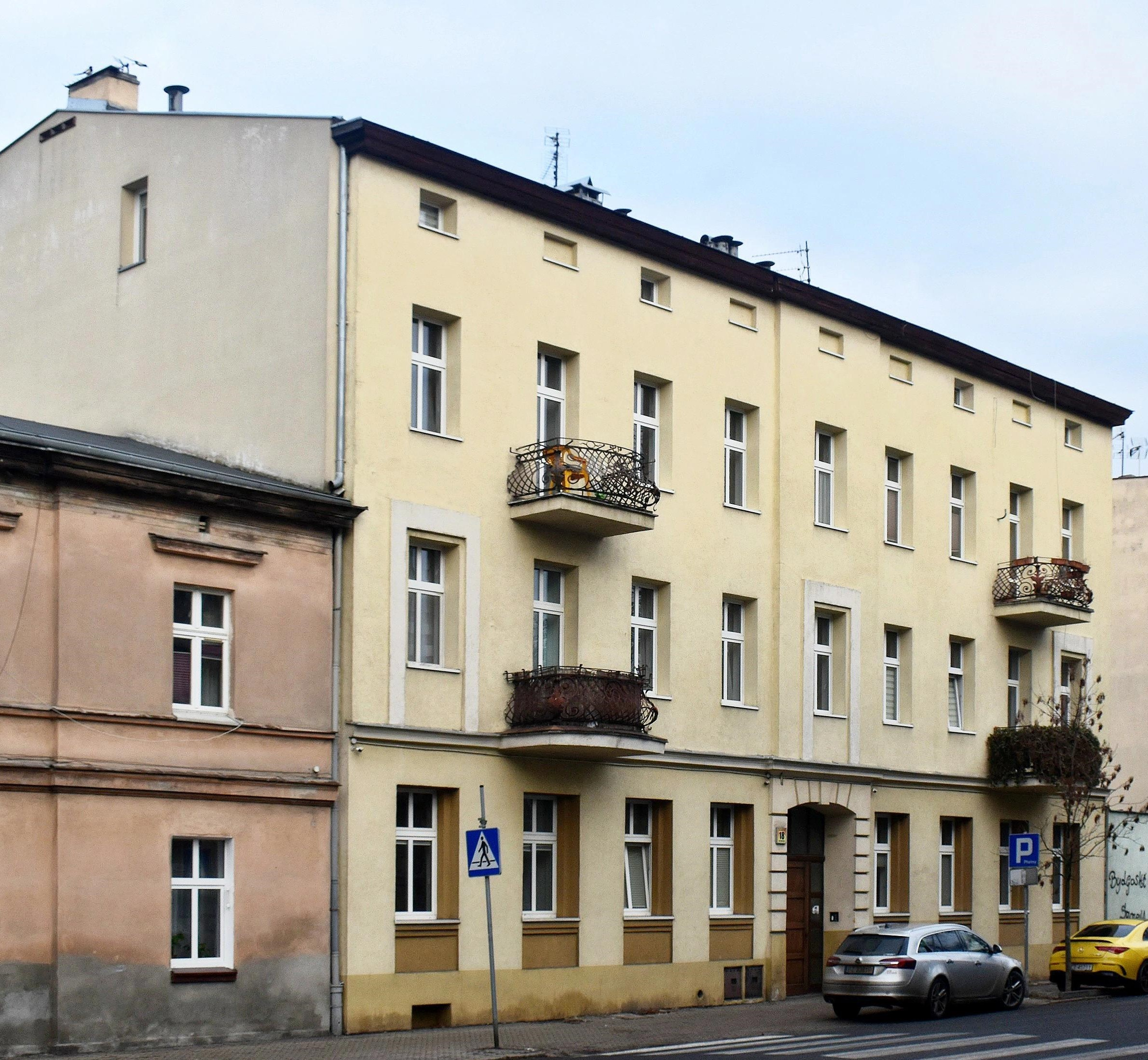
View from the street

=== Building at 19, corner with 41 Sienkiewicza Street ===
The renovation carried out in 2020 reinforced the design of its facade. The stories are separated by cornices, the roof is supported by consoles and pediments are incorporated above the windows. Massive balconies are decorated with balustrades and the side garage entrance displays a large wrought iron fence.

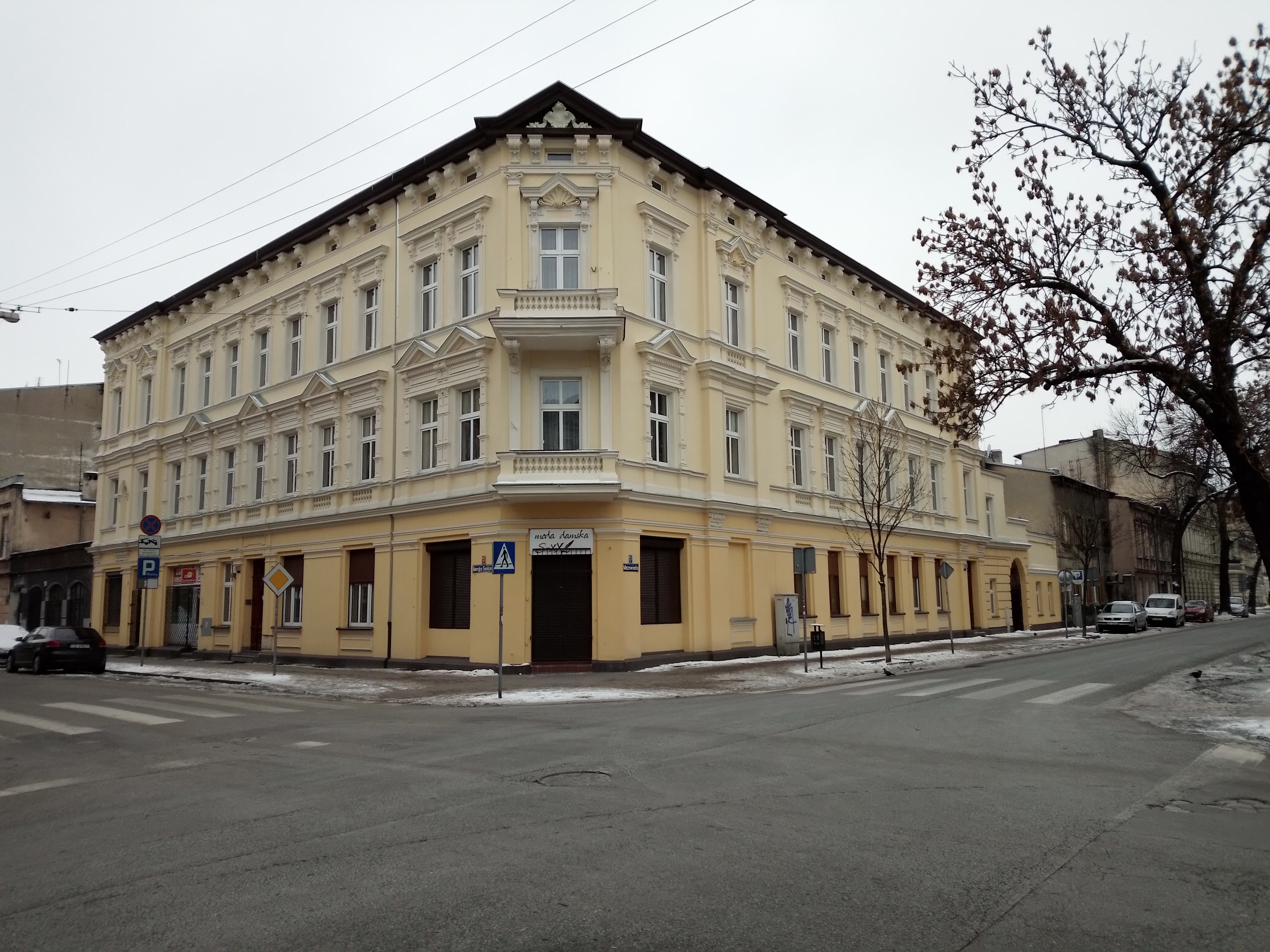
View from street crossing

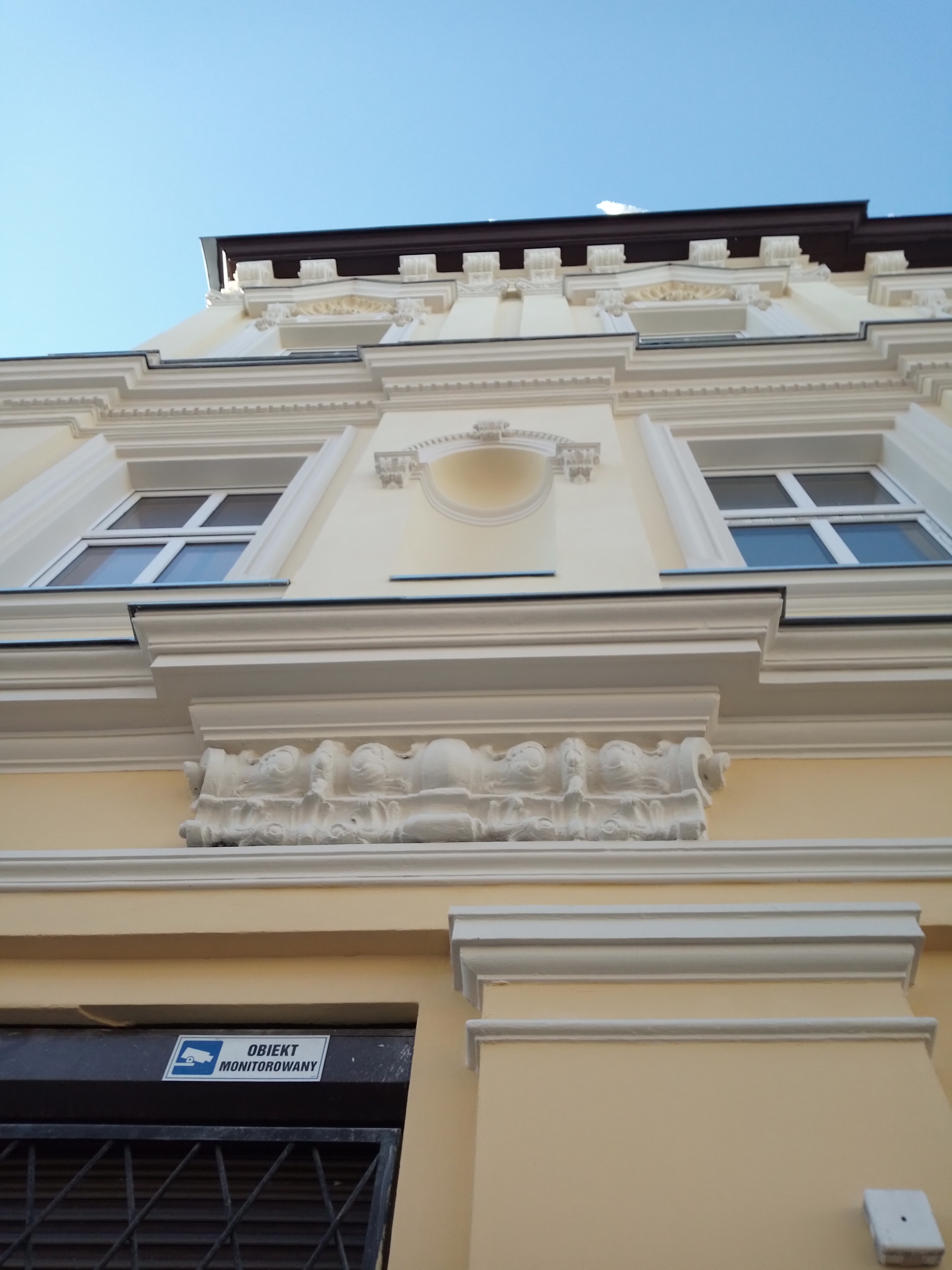
Stuccos details

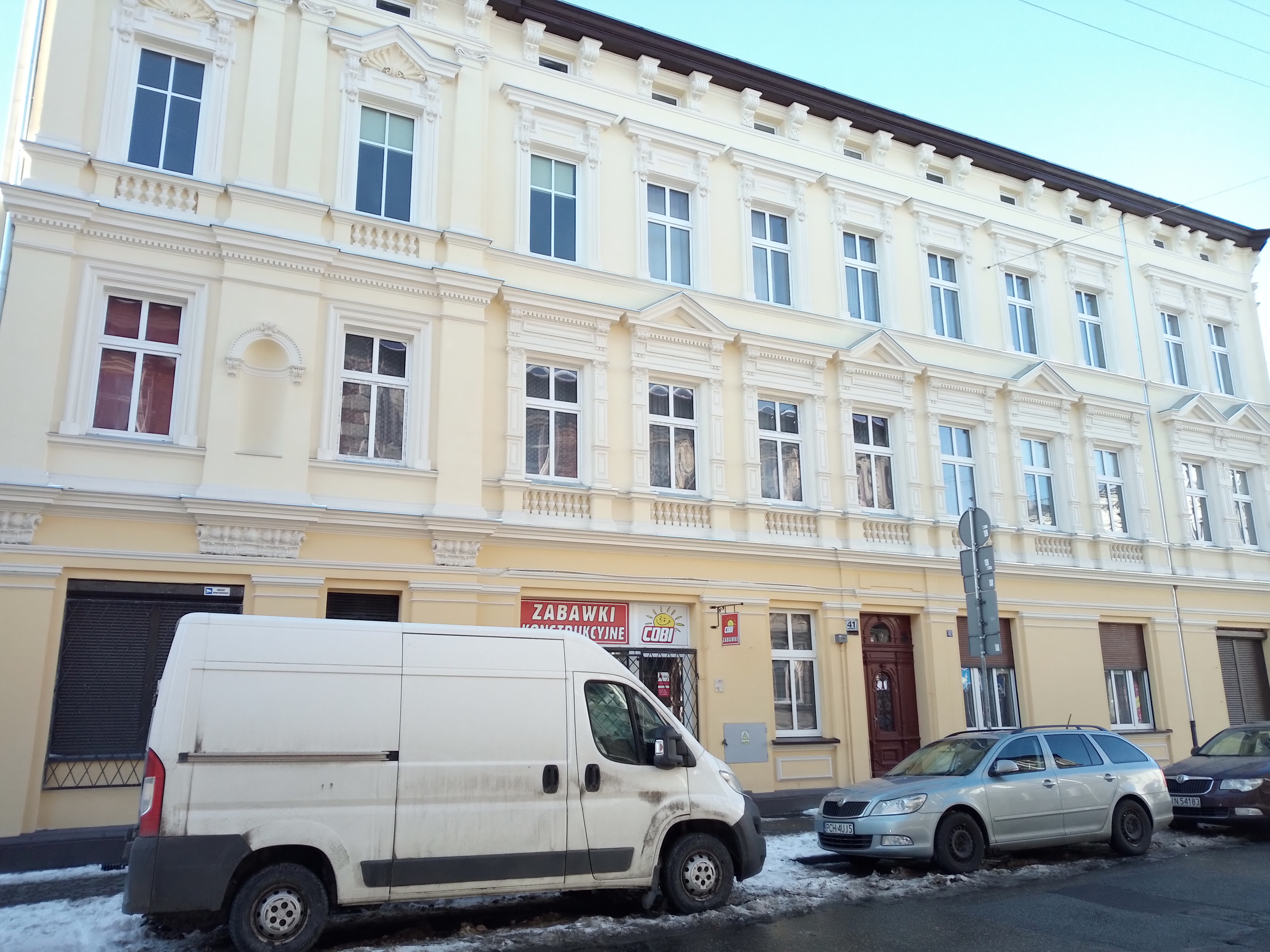
Facade on Sienkiewicza street

=== House at 20 ===
As one of the first houses built in the street, it kept few architectural details, apart from the triangular pediment adorned with motifs above the entrance.

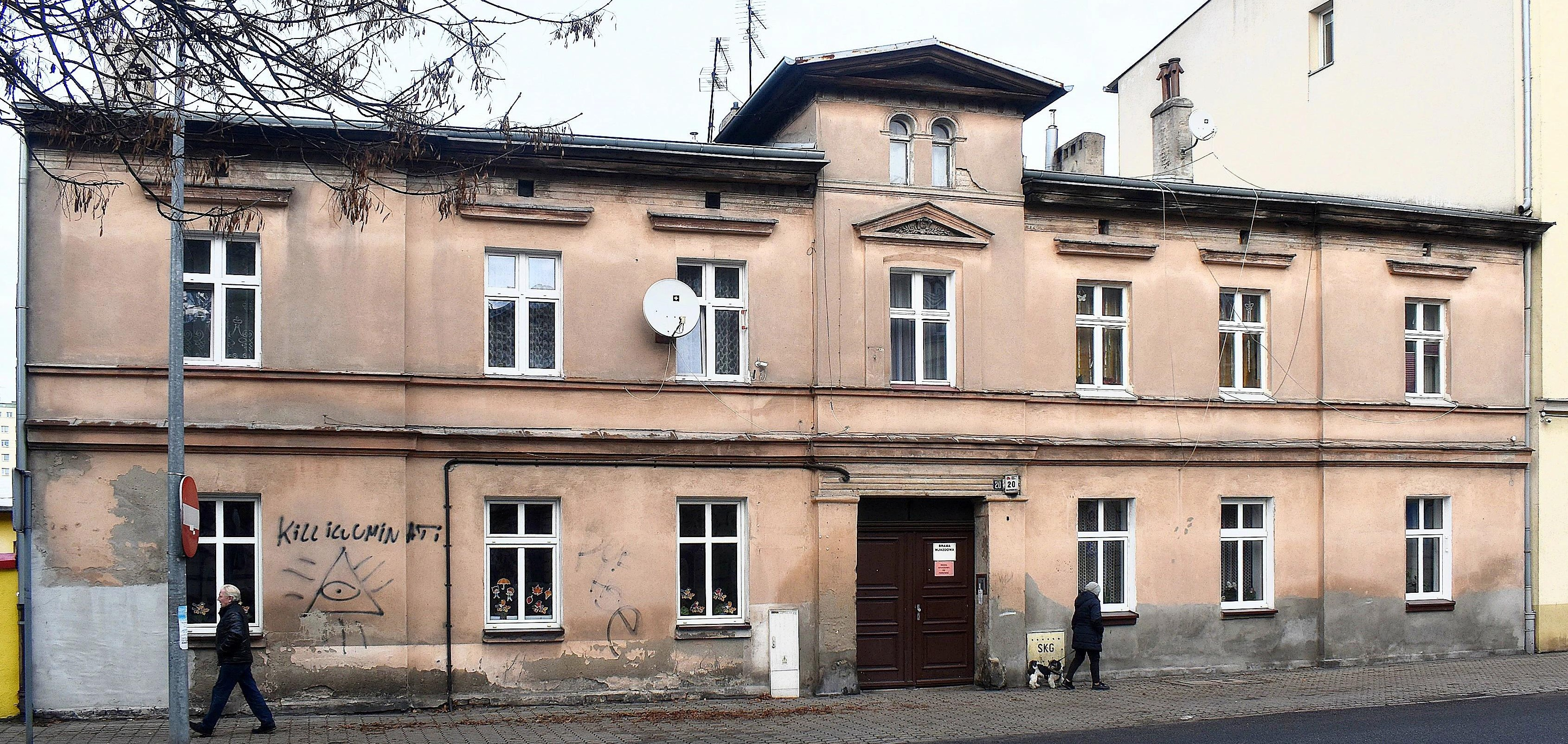
Facade on the street

=== House at 23 ===
Recently refurbished (2024), the building architecture mirrors the one at No. 20, built the same year.

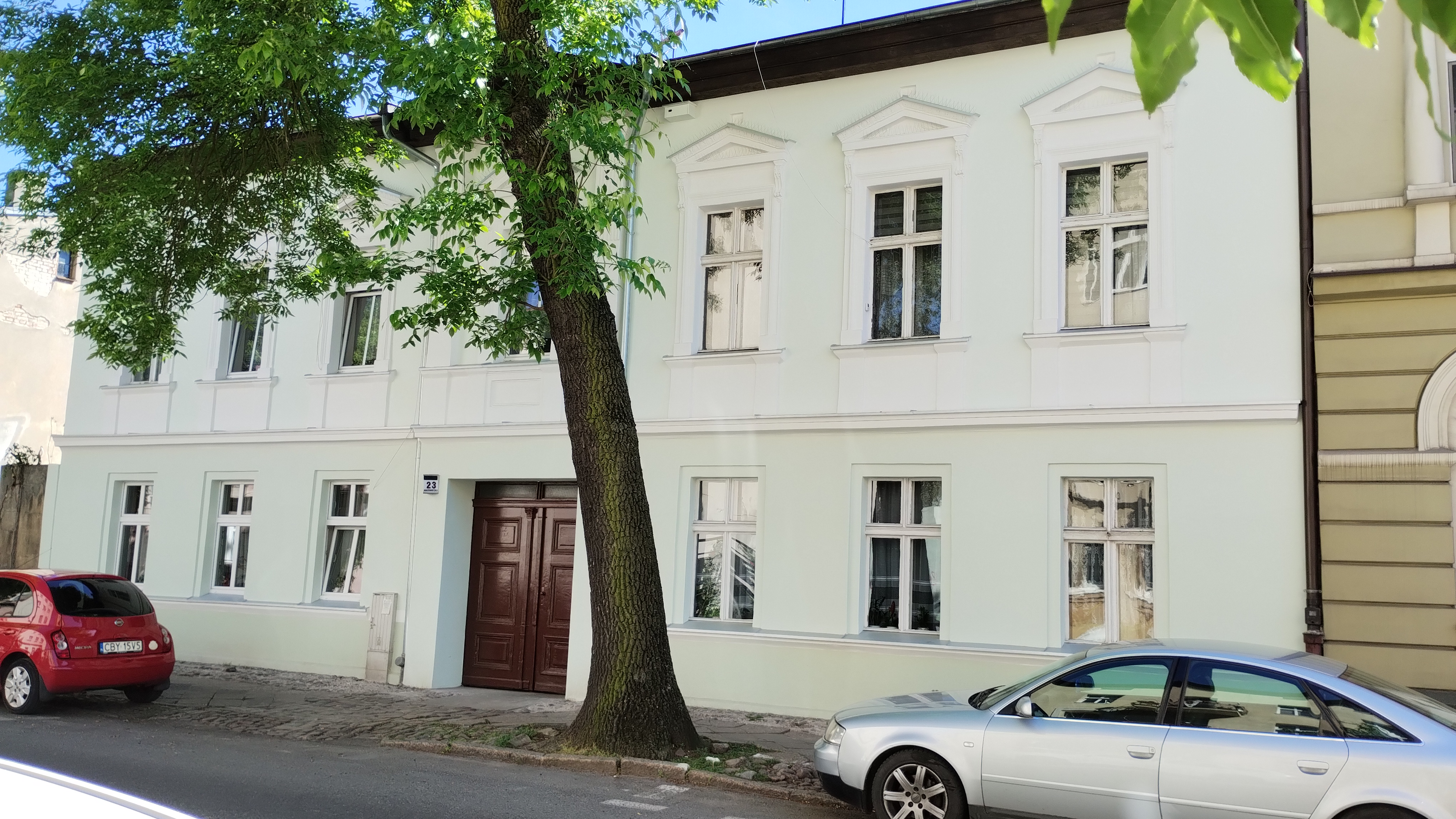
View of the renovated house

=== Tenement at 14 Wileńska street ===
Registered on Kuyavian-Pomeranian Heritage list Nr.725837, Reg.A/1528 (6 May 2009) This city heritage building boasts two decorated facades and a large corner bay window stretching on two levels.

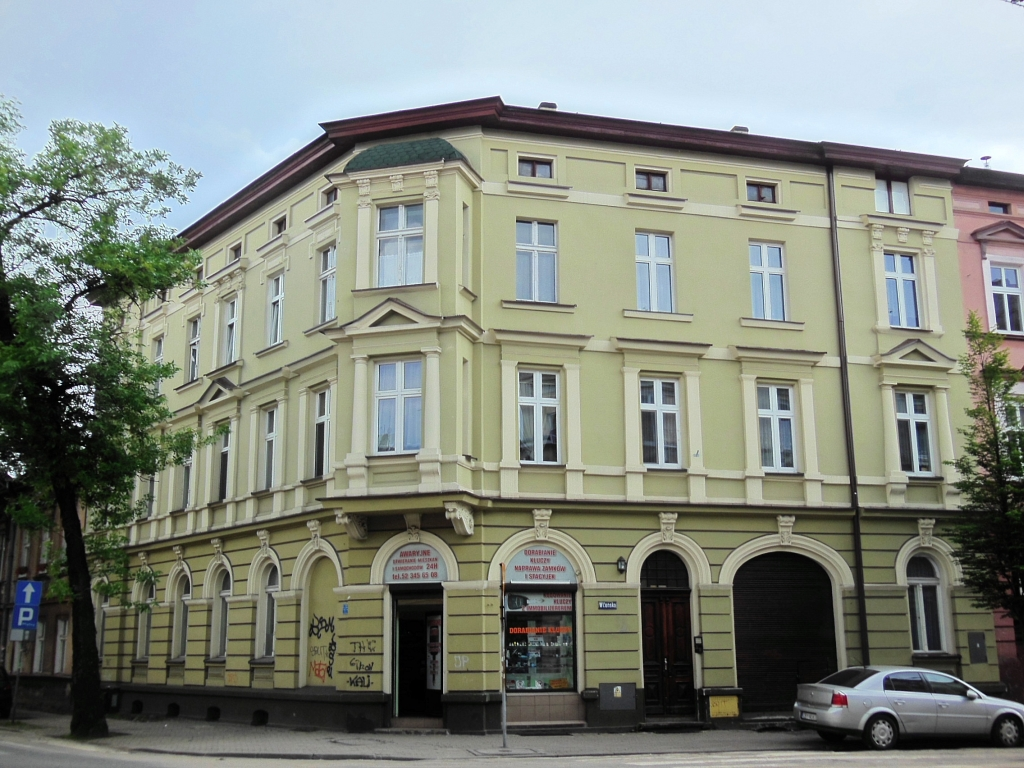
Corner view

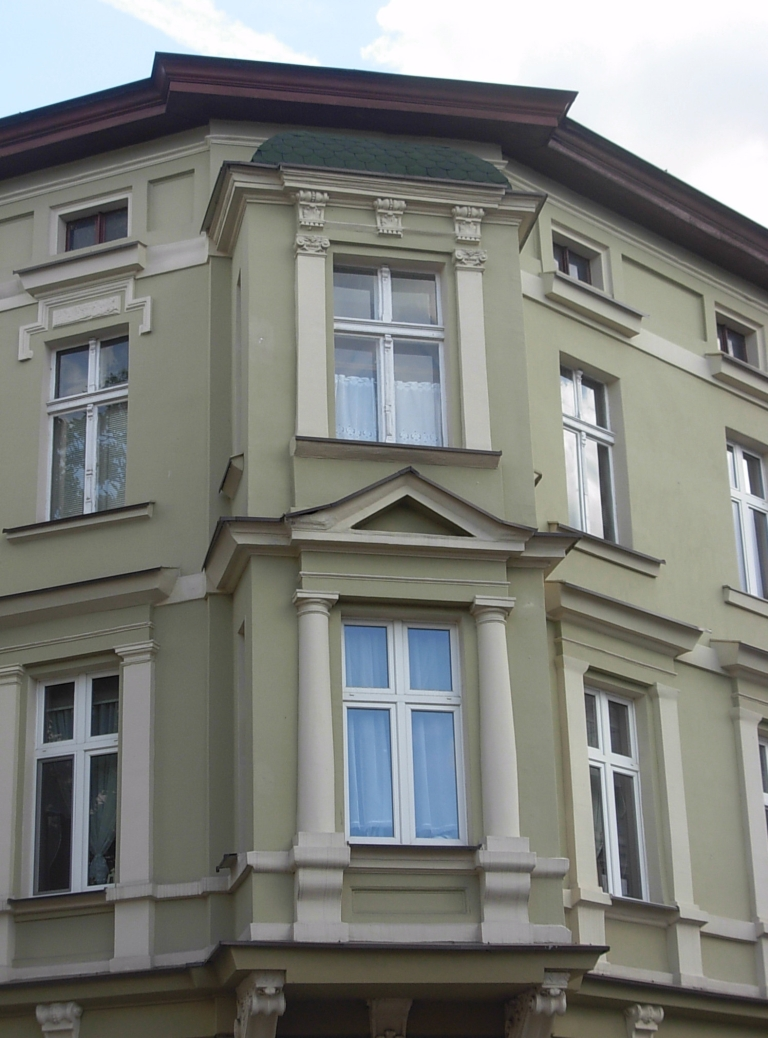
Corner bay window

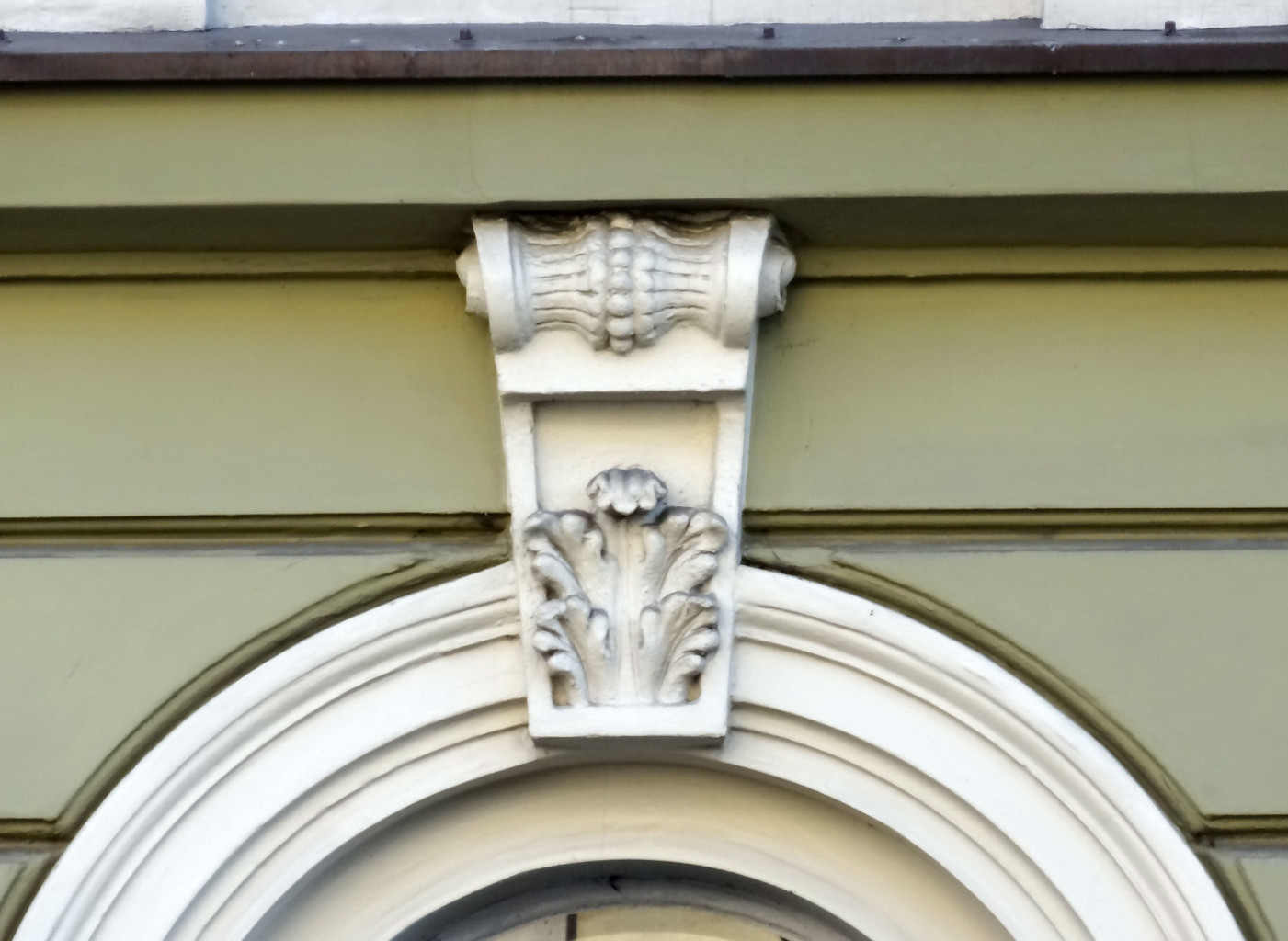
Architectural detail

=== Tenement at 11 Wileńska street ===
Restored in 2017, the massive tenement displays two decorated facades on each street. The corner frontage features two heavy balconies.

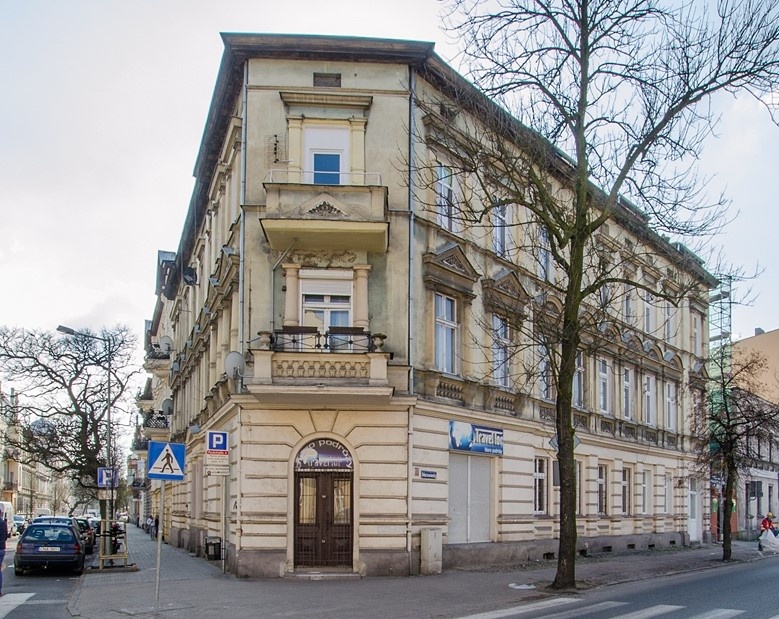
Facade seen from the street intersection

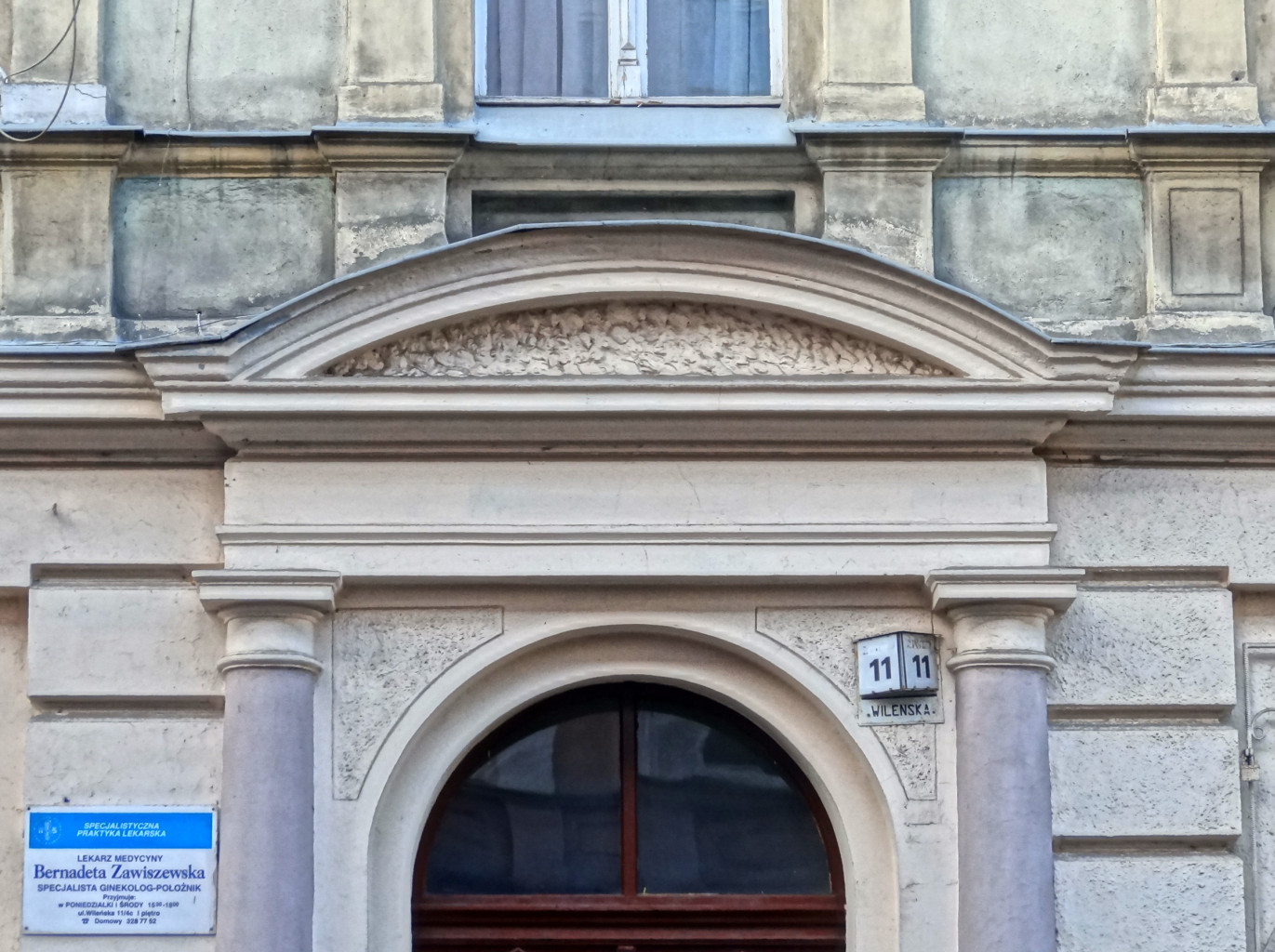
Pediment details

=== Cohnfeld's house at 25 ===
Albin Cohnfeld was a wealthy Jewish merchant of Bromberg, member (and vice-president) of the "Jewish Management Board and the Council of Representatives" of the city, from 1903 to 1920. At the end of the 1880s, Cohnfeld received a concession from the city to build barracks in today's Pomorska street, which was completed in 1890: nowadays, the plot is called Londynek.

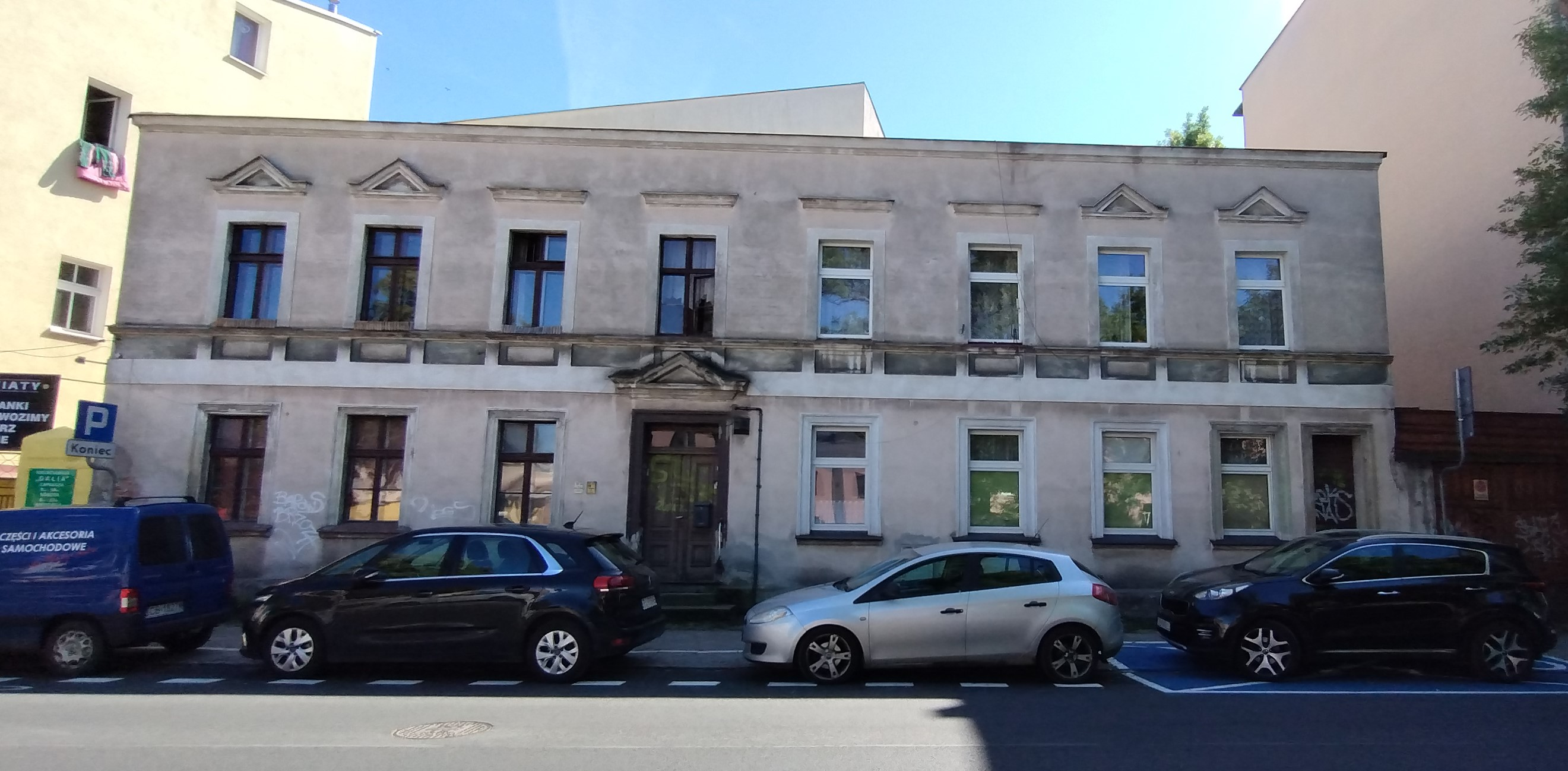
View of the house at 25

=== Tenement at 27 ===
The large facade displays early forms of modern architecture, with tall and long vertical windows, under a wall gable still shaped with Art Nouveau design.

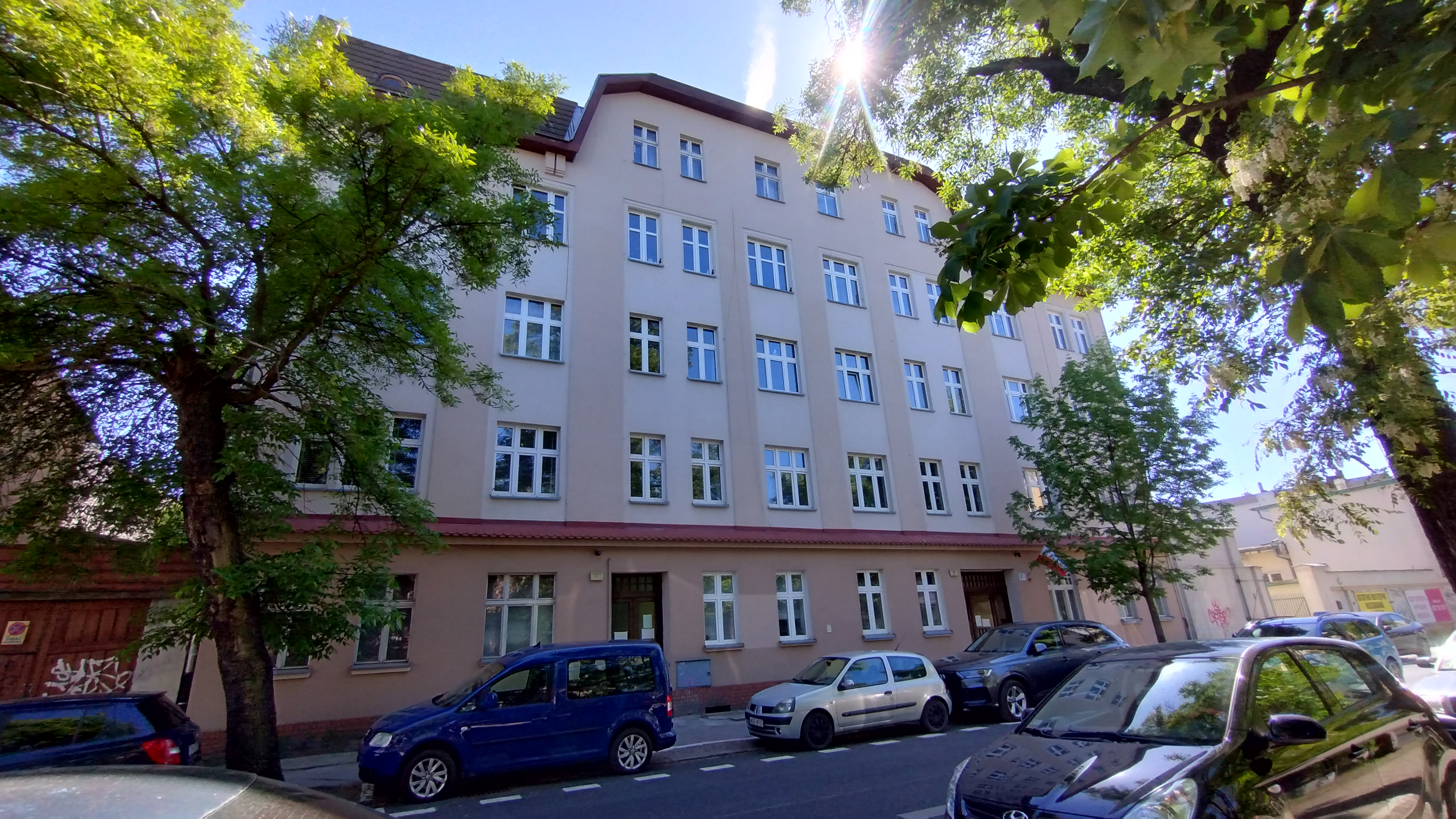
View from the street

=== Faculty of Animal Breeding and Biology at 28 ===
Since 1971, the area is housing the faculty of the Bydgoszcz University of Science and Technology. There former plant edifice has been refurbished and hosts today one of the building of the Faculty of Animal Breeding and Biology of Bydgoszcz.

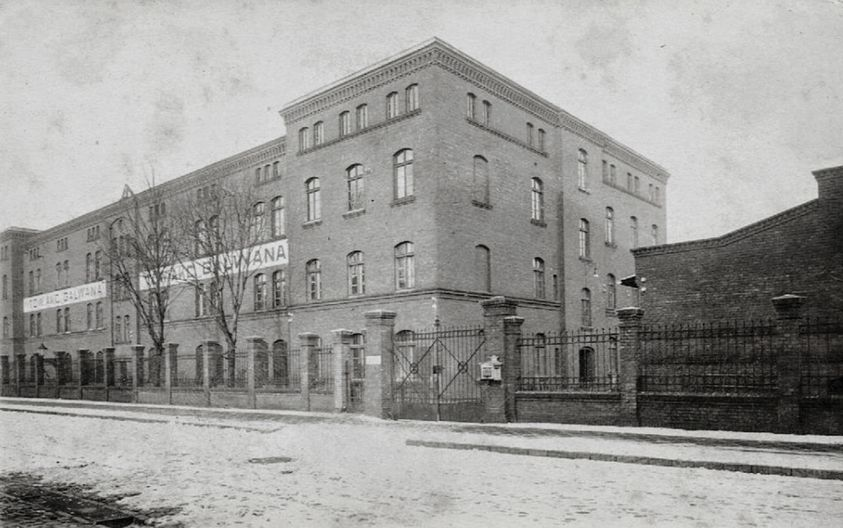
The factory ca 1922

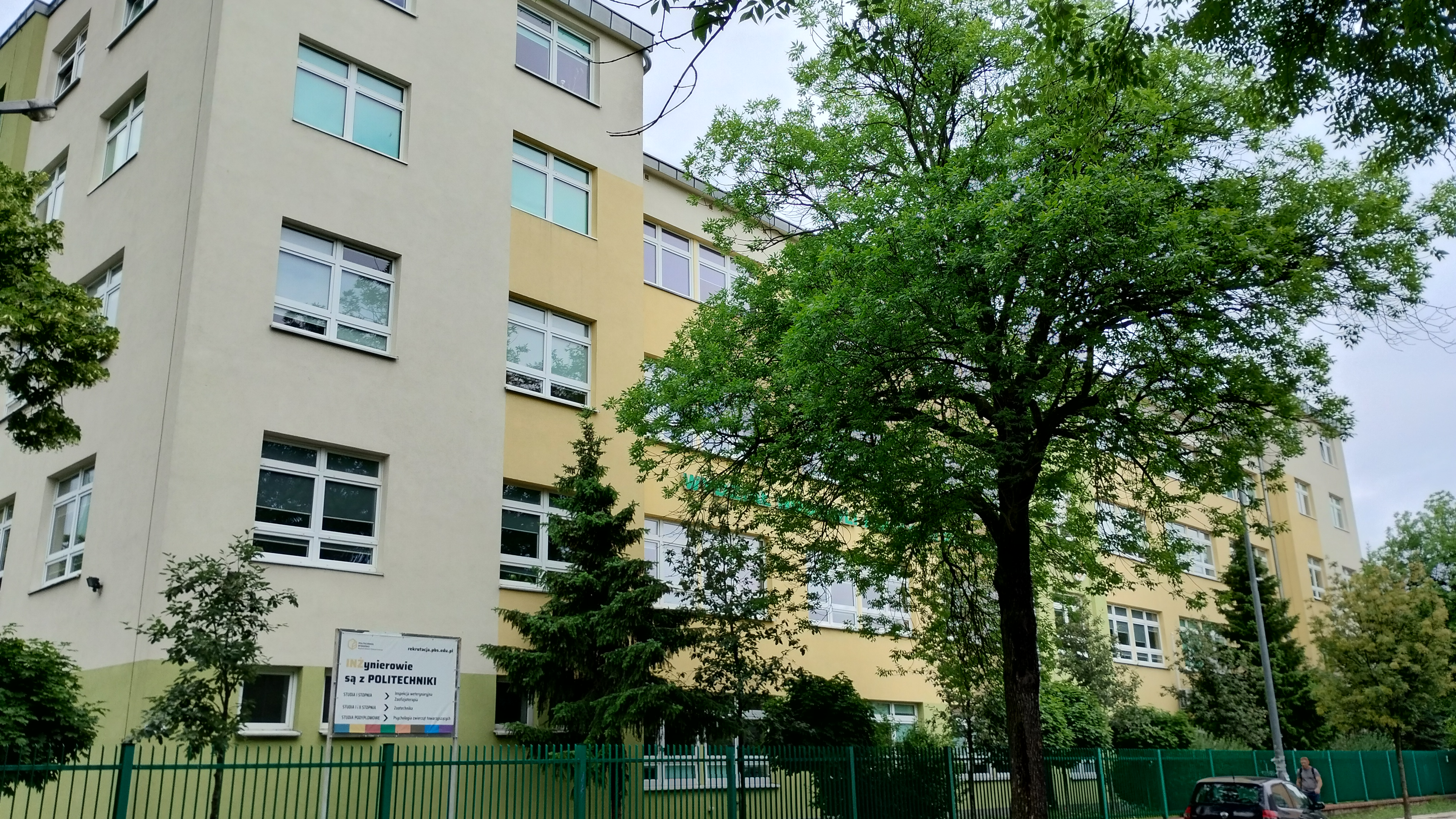
The faculty building today

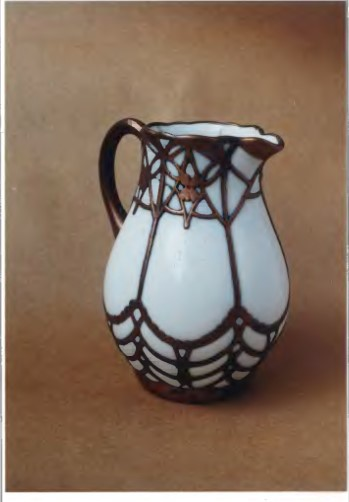
Instance of porcelain production

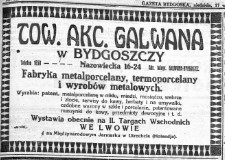
Advertising for Galwana in 1922

== See also ==
- Bydgoszcz
- Bydgoszcz Architects (1850–1970s)
- Joanna Rajkowska
- Hasan Konopacki
- Bydgoszcz Tool Factory "BEFANA"

== Bibliography ==
- Umiński, Janusz (1996). Bydgoszcz. Przewodnik [Bydgoszcz. Guide] (in Polish). Bydgoszcz: Regionalny Oddział PTTK "Szlak Brdy".
- Former Galwana company - Sójkowska, Danuta (1996). "Materiały do dziejow kultury i sztuki bydgoszczy i regionu T7. Towarzystwo Akcyjne "Galwana" w Bydgoszczy" [Joint Stock Company "Galwana" in Bydgoszcz]. Biblioteka Uniwersytetu Kazimierza Wielkiego W Bydgoszczy (in Polish). Bydgoszcz: Wojewódzki Ośrodek Kultury w Bydgoszczy: 114–133.
