= Yield (finance) =

Income return on an investment expressed as a percentage of its value

In finance, the yield on a security is a measure of the ex-ante return to a holder of the security. It is one component of return on an investment, the other component being the change in the market price of the security. It is a measure applied to fixed income securities, common stocks, preferred stocks, convertible stocks and bonds, annuities and real estate investments.

There are various types of yield, and the method of calculation depends on the particular type of yield and the type of security.

== Fixed income securities ==
The coupon rate (or nominal rate) on a fixed income security is the interest that the issuer agrees to pay to the security holder each year, expressed as a percentage of the security's principal amount (par value).

The current yield is the ratio of the annual interest (coupon) payment and the bond's market price.

The yield to maturity is an estimate of the total rate of return anticipated to be earned by an investor who buys a bond at a given market price, holds it to maturity, and receives all interest payments and the payment of par value on schedule. Unlike current yield, it takes into account the payment of principal to the bondholder when the bond matures.

For bonds with embedded call or put options:

- yield to call uses the same methodology as the yield to maturity, but assumes that the issuer calls the bond at the first opportunity instead of allowing it to be held until maturity;
- yield to put assumes that the bondholder sells the bond back to the issuer at the first opportunity; and
- yield to worst is the lowest of the yield to all possible call dates, yield to all possible put dates and yield to maturity.

Par yield assumes that the security's market price is equal to par value (also known as face value or nominal value). It is the metric used in the U.S. Treasury's daily official "Treasury Par Yield Curve Rates".

== Preferred shares ==
The dividend rate is the total amount of dividends paid in a year, divided by the principal value of the preferred share. The current yield is those same payments divided by the preferred share's market price. If the preferred share has a maturity or call provision (which is not always the case), yield to maturity and yield to call can be calculated.

== Common shares ==
The current dividend yield is the annualized cash dividend (in dollars, RMB, Yen, etc.) divided by the current market price of one share. Most web sites and reports are updated with the expected future year's payments, not the past year's.

== REITs, royalty trusts, income trusts, annuities ==
REIT dividends can include ordinary income, capital gains and return of capital.

== Real estate and property ==
Several different yields are used as measures of a real estate investment, including initial, equivalent and reversionary yields.

Initial yield is the annualised rents of a property expressed as a percentage of the property value. E.g. £100,000 passing rent per annum £1,850,000 valuation 100000/1850000 = 0.054 or 5.4%

Reversionary yield is the anticipated yield to which the initial yield will rise (or fall) once the rent reaches the ERV. E.g. £150,000 ERV per annum £1,850,000 valuation 150000/1850000 = 0.081 or 8.1%

Equivalent yield lies somewhere in between the initial yield and reversionary yield, it encapsulates the DCF of the property with rents rising (or falling) from the current annualised rent to the underlying estimated rental value (ERV) less costs that are incurred along the way. The discount rate used to calculate the net present value (NPV) of the DCF to equal zero is the equivalent yield, or the IRR.

The calculation not only takes into account all costs, but other assumptions including rent reviews and void periods. A trial and error method can be used to identify the equivalent yield of a DCF, or if using Excel, the goal seek function can be used.

== Factors affecting the yield ==
All financial instruments compete with each other in the financial markets. Investor perceptions of risk influence the yield they require to justify investment in a particular security. Higher yields allow owners to recoup their investments sooner, and so lessen risk. All other things being equal, the weaker the credit rating of the issuer, the higher the yield must be. This reflects the tendency for investors to require compensation for the additional risk that the issuer may default on its obligations to pay interest and repay the principal at par value.

Yield levels vary with expectations of inflation and the general outlook for the economy (the business cycle). Fears of high inflation in the future mean that investors ask for a higher yield today to protect their purchasing power.

The yield on a fixed income security is inversely related to financial market interest rates. If market rates rise, for example due to inflation or a change in the economy, the price of a bond or note falls, driving its yield higher to maintain parity with market rates. Conversely, if market rates decline, then the price of the bond should increase, driving its yield lower, all else being equal.

Under normal market conditions, long-term fixed income securities (for example, a 10-year bond) have higher yields than short-term securities (e.g., a 2-year bond). This reflects the fact that long-term securities are more exposed to the uncertainties of what could happen in the future—especially changes in market rates of interest. Therefore, longer maturity securities have more potential price volatility. The relationship between yield and maturity is described by the yield curve.

== Special cases ==
Coupon payments from floating rate bonds and notes and Treasury Inflation Protected Securities are reset periodically based on a specified benchmark. It is not possible to accurately calculate the future stream of coupon payments from these securities, so yield to maturity and internal rates of return cannot be calculated. Other metrics must be used.

== See also ==
- Ecological yield
- Yield curve
- 30-day yield
- 7-day SEC yield
- Nominal yield
- Bond (finance)
- Roll yield
