= Rentier capitalism =

Capitalism featuring rent-seeking without wealth creation

Rentier capitalism is a concept in Marxist and heterodox economics that refers to rent-seeking and exploitation by companies in capitalist systems. The term was developed by Austrian social geographer Hans Bobek describing an economic system that was widespread in antiquity and still widespread in the Middle East, where productive investments are largely lacking and the highest possible share of income is skimmed off from ground-rents, leases and rents. Consequently, in many developing countries, rentier capitalism is an obstacle to economic development. A rentier is someone who earns income from capital without working. This is generally done through ownership of assets that generate yield (cash generated by assets), such as rental properties, shares in dividend-paying companies, or bonds that pay interest.

== Usage by Marxists ==
Although the combination of words "rentier capitalism" was never used by Karl Marx himself, it is compatible with the Marxist idea of surplus value extraction. In his early works, Karl Marx juxtaposes the terms "rentier" and "capitalist" to argue that a rentier tends to exhaust his profits, whereas a capitalist must perforce re-invest most of the surplus value in order to survive competition. He wrote, "Therefore, the means of the extravagant rentier diminish daily in inverse proportion to the growing possibilities and temptations of pleasure. He must, therefore, either consume his capital himself, and in doing so bring about his own ruin, or become an industrial capitalist".

Later in life, including in the manuscript later published as Das Capital, Vol. 3 Marx further segments so-called rentiers into interest-bearing (finance) capitalists and a separate class of landowners, arguing that the interest from invested capital and rent from private land are economically different. He does however in various places, including a letter to Friedrich Engels, acknowledge that at some point finance capital might come to own all land and in doing so eliminate the separate landlord class. It is a matter of ongoing debate as to whether or not this has come to pass.

Vladimir Lenin asserts that the growth of a stratum of idle rentiers under capitalism is inevitable and accelerated due to imperialism:

Hence the extraordinary growth of a class, or rather, of a stratum of rentiers, i.e., people who live by 'clipping coupons' [in the sense of collecting interest payments on bonds], who take no part in any enterprise whatever, whose profession is idleness. The export of capital, one of the most essential economic bases of imperialism, still more completely isolates the rentiers from production and sets the seal of parasitism on the whole country that lives by exploiting the labour of several overseas countries and colonies.

== Current usage ==
In contemporary discourse, the term “rentier capitalist” refers to any individual, firm, or even oligarchy, actors that increasingly derive income from the ownership of products. Whereby they rent such products and generate unproductive capital, creating gaps in economic productivity while simultaneously increasing revenue. The term rentier state is mainly used not in its original meaning, as an imperialistic state thriving on labor of other countries and colonies, but as a state which derives all or a substantial portion of its national revenues from the rent of indigenous resources to external clients.

Guy Standing has claimed rentier capitalism has become predominant in capitalistic economies since the 1980s. Brett Christophers of Uppsala University, Sweden has asserted that rentier capitalism has been the foundation of the United Kingdom's economic policy from the 1970s onwards. With the return of high inflation to the United Kingdom in 2022, political economist William Davies surveys recent British economic events in light of rentier capitalism.

== See also ==
- Crony capitalism
- Financialization
- Parasitism (social offense)
- Rentier state
- Rent-seeking
- Georgism

== Bibliography ==
- Robert Pollin, "Resurrection of the Rentier", in New Left Review 46, July–August 2007, pp. 140–153.
- Michael Hudson. Financial Capitalism v. Industrial Capitalism. The Other Canon Conference on Production Capitalism vs. Financial Capitalism (Oslo, 3–4 September 1998).
- Karl Marx, "The Economic and Philosophical Manuscripts", Institute of Marxism–Leninism in the Union of Soviet Socialist Republics, 1932. The Economic and Philosophical Manuscripts
- Karl Marx, "Theories of Surplus-Value", Progress Publishers, 1863. Economic Manuscripts: Theories of Surplus-Value by Karl Marx 1863
- Vladimir Lenin, "Imperialism, the Highest Stage of Capitalism", Lenin's Selected Works, Progress Publishers, 1963, Moscow, Volume 1, pp. 667–766. Lenin: Imperialism, the Highest Stage of Capitalism'
- Ahmed Henni, Le capitalisme de rente: De la société du travail industriel à la société des rentiers. Paris: Harmattan, 2012. ISBN 9782296481176
- Guy Standing, The Corruption of Capitalism Why rentiers thrive and work does not pay Biteback Publishing (2016) ISBN 9781785900440
