= Par yield =

In finance, par yield (or par value yield) is the yield on a fixed income security assuming that its market price is equal to par value (also known as face value or nominal value). Par yield is used to derive the U.S. Treasury’s daily official “Treasury Par Yield Curve Rates”, which are used by investors to price debt securities traded in public markets, and by lenders to set interest rates on many other types of debt, including bank loans and mortgages.

== Compared to yield to maturity ==
Par yields are used to address a problem known as the "coupon effect." As finance scholars Martellini, Priaulet and Priaulet and others have pointed out, two bonds with the exact same maturity date but different coupon rates will not necessarily have the same yield to maturity. This disparity is due to differing coupon cash flow streams over the life of the two bonds, even when the maturity date and coupon payment dates are exactly the same. Finance scholar Frank J. Fabozzi has stated that because of the coupon effect, a yield-to-maturity yield curve should not be used to value bonds. Par yield analysis is useful because it avoids the coupon effect, since a bond trading at par has a coupon yield equal to its yield to maturity, according to Martinelli et al.

== Calculation of par yield ==
Par yield is based on the assumption that the security in question has a price equal to par value. When the price is assumed to be par value ($100 in the equation below) and the coupon stream and maturity date are already known, the equation below can be solved for par yield.

$\frac{100 c}{1 + R(0,1)} + \frac{100 c}{(1 + R(0,2))^2} + \cdots + \frac{100 + 100c}{(1+R(0,n))^n } = 100.$

This can be more succinctly expressed with the prices of zero coupon bonds:

$c=\frac{1-P_n}{\sum_{k=1}^nP_k}$

Here $R(0,n)$ denotes the yield (on annual interest rate basis) of an $n$-year zero-coupon bond (ZCB), and $P_n$ denotes the price of an $n$-year ZCB.

== U.S. Treasury par yield curve rates ==
In the United States, the Department of the Treasury publishes official “Treasury Par Yield Curve Rates” on a daily basis. According to Fabozzi, the Treasury yield curve is used by investors to price debt securities traded in public markets, and by lenders to set interest rates on many other types of debt, including bank loans and mortgages.

== Other uses ==
Par yield is also used to design fixed income securities and interest swaps.

== See also ==
- Nominal yield
