= 30-day yield =

Standardized investment performance metric in the United States

In the United States, 30-day yield is a standardized yield calculation for bond funds. The formula for calculating 30-day yield is specified by the U.S. Securities and Exchange Commission (SEC). The formula translates the bond fund's current portfolio income into a standardized yield for reporting and comparison purposes. A bond fund's 30-day yield may appear in the fund's "Statement of Additional Information (SAI)" in its prospectus.

Because the 30-day yield is a standardized mandatory calculation for all United States bond funds, it serves as a common ground comparison of yield performance. Its weakness lies in the fact that funds tend to trade actively and do not hold bonds until maturity. In addition, funds do not mature. For this reason, analysts often consider a distribution yield to be a better measure of a fund's income-generating potential.

United States money market funds report a 7-day SEC yield. The rate expresses how much the fund would yield if it paid income at the same level as it did in the prior 7 days for a whole year. It is calculated by taking the sum of the income paid out over the period divided by 7, and multiplying that quantity by 36500 (365 days x 100).

== Bond fund yield calculation ==
The SEC yield calculation for a bond fund is essentially an annualized version of the ratio of interest and dividends per share (or yield to maturity for fixed income funds) earned over the last month, factoring in the impact of shareholder expenses. It is an adjusted version of yield to maturity for the bonds in the portfolio, as it does take into account the amortization of the premiums or discounts at which the bonds are trading. Because bond funds trade actively and prices fluctuate, the rate may not be a good indicator of future results. However, because the calculation is standardized, it provides a standard comparison measure for funds. An appropriate use is to make daily/weekly adjustments to a bond mutual fund price series to determine running total return.

The formula for SEC 30-day yield is $\mathrm{Yield} = 2 \left[ \left(\frac{a-b}{cd}+1\right)^6-1\right].$

Where:

- a = dividends and interest collected during the past 30 days
- b = accrued expenses of the past 30 days
- c = average daily number of outstanding shares that were entitled to distributions
- d = the maximum public offering price per share on the last day of the period
