= Wileńska street (Bydgoszcz) =

Street in Bydgoszcz, Poland

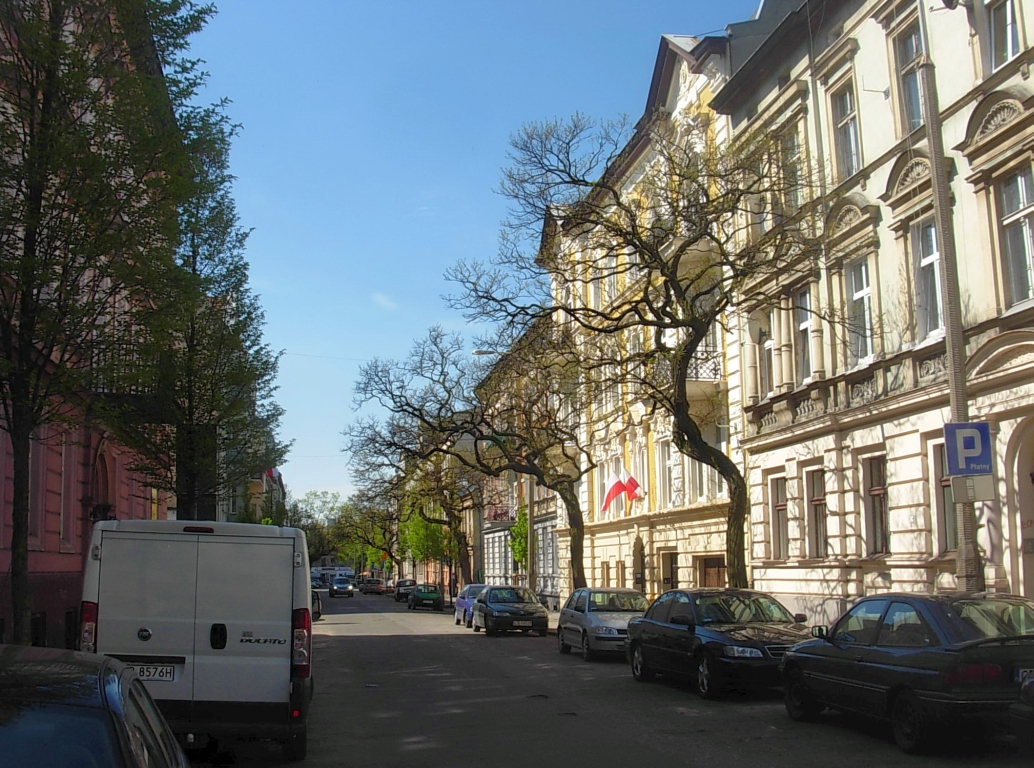
- Street view to the south

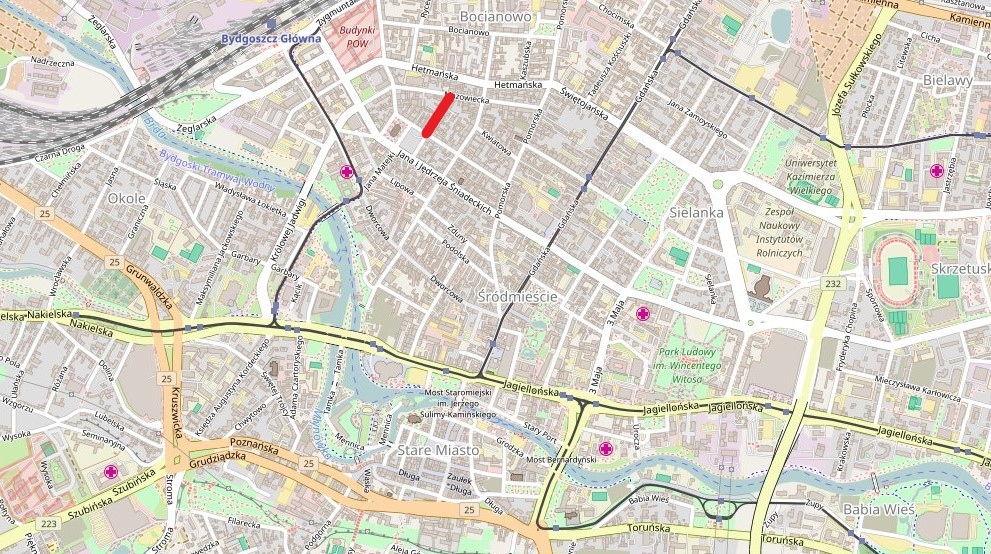
- Wileńska street highlighted on a map
- Native name: Ulica Wileńska w Bydgoszczy (Polish)
- Former name: Boye straße / Boiestraße
- Part of: Śródmieście district
- Namesake: Vilnius
- Owner: City of Bydgoszcz
- Length: 160 m (520 ft)
- Width: c. 10 metres (33 ft)
- Location: Bydgoszcz, Poland
- Coordinates: 53°07′57″N 18°00′01″E
- Major junctions: Piastowski Square, Bolesława Chrobrego Street, Mazowiecka street

Construction
- Construction start: Late 1880s
- Completed: 1910

Wileńska street is a short path of the downtown district of Bydgoszcz, Poland. Despite its length, its frontages display a variety of architectural styles.

== History and location ==
The earliest representation of the street can be seen on an 1876 map where still no buildings are erected. The 1888 address book from Bromberg lists the first house on the street, located at the corner with the ElisabethMarkt (today's Piastowski Square). It is only in 1893 that the first three tenements are registered in the street as such.

Further on, the development of the path was completed in 1910, with the current 13 houses registered.

The street bore only two names through time. In the 19th century up until 1920 and during German occupation, Boyestraße or Boiestraße. Reinhold Boie (1831–1907) was the Mayor of Bromberg/Bydgoszcz from 5 August 1869 to 30 April 1877. Between 1920 and 1939, and since 1945, Ulica Wileńska.

The current appellation refers to the capital of Lithuania, Vilnius, which is named Wilno in Polish.

The street follows a roughly south–north axis, from the Piastowski Square and Chrobrego street to the junction with Mazowiecka street.

== Main areas and edifices ==
=== Tenement at 11 Piastowski Square, corner with Wileńska Street ===
First address was 6 Elisabeth Markt, the first owner being a rentier, Fritz Dörnbrack, who lived at 11 Elisabeth Straße, now 37 Śniadecki Street .

The elevation, recently refurbished (2016), shows evident Neo-Classicist features. Symmetry of both facades, plain pedimented windows and carved cartouches with children figures. The main gate is flanked by two lean columns.

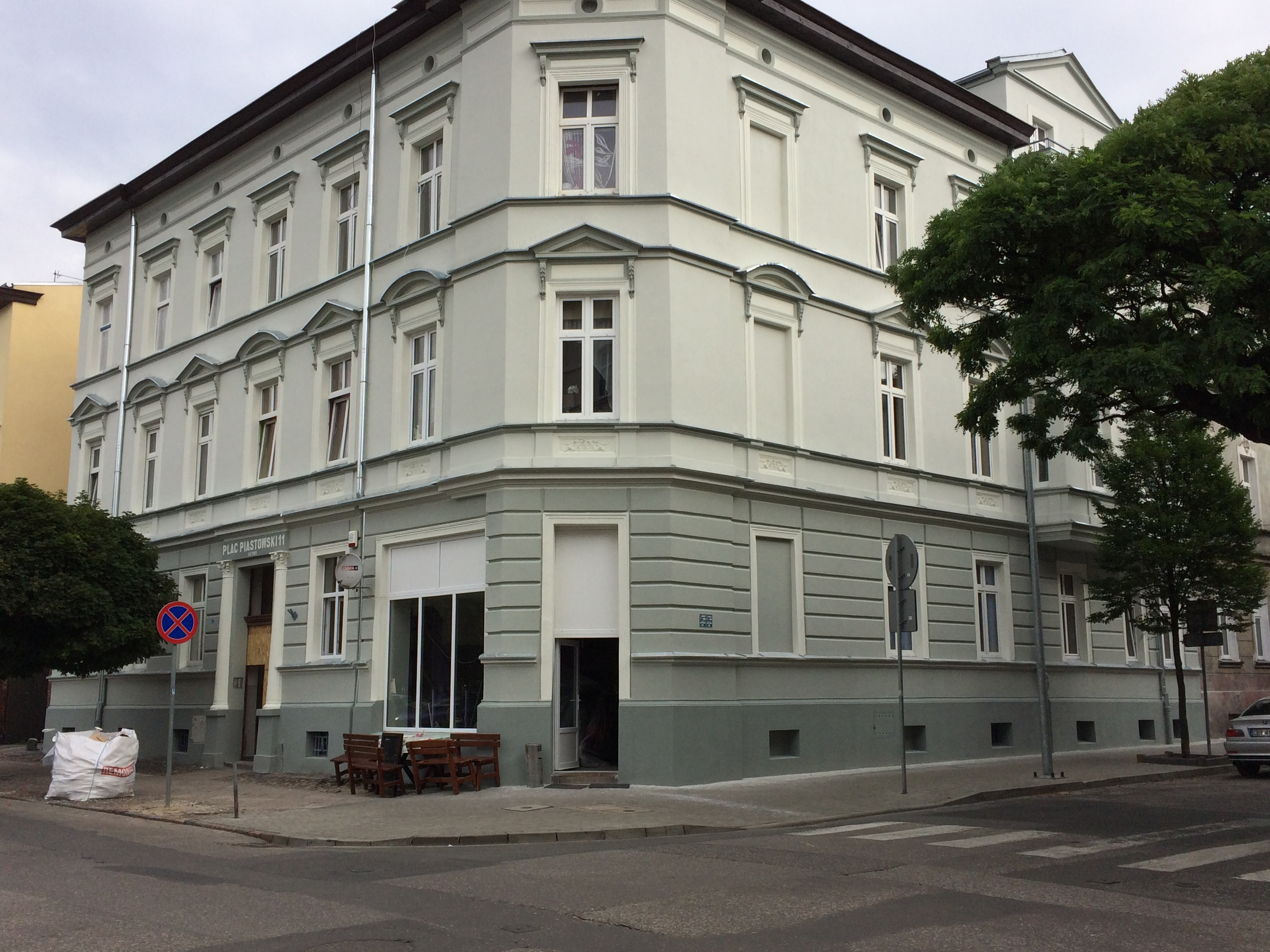
Corner view

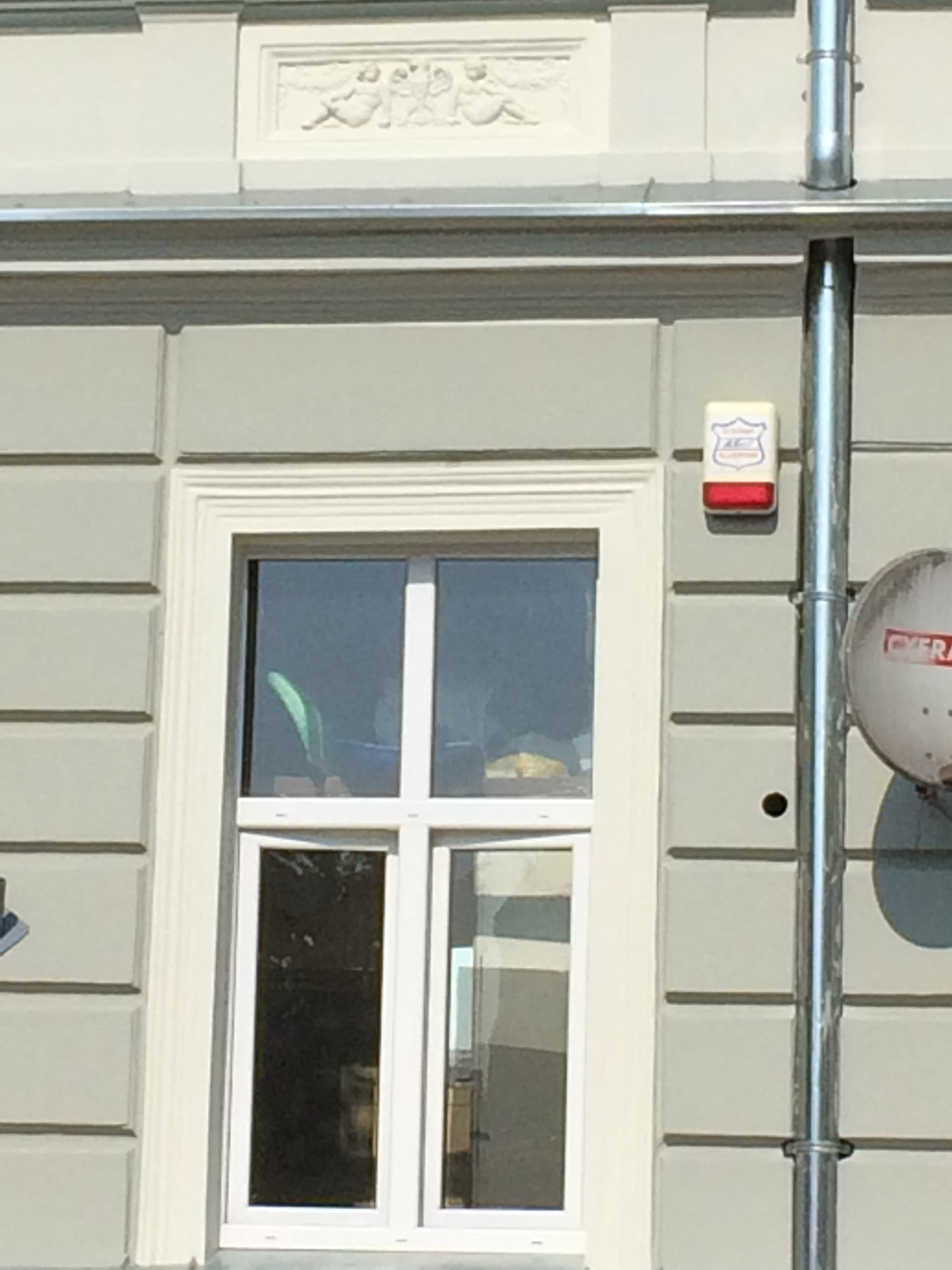
Detail of a window cartouche

=== Tenement at 1 ===
The tenement was one of the last ones erected in the street. Initially registered at 13 Boiestraße, it was the property of Julius Lüdtke.

The frontage displays late Art Nouveau details, including a plastered transom light with vertical columns and stuccoed motifs figuring flowers, festoons and floral shapes. The building underwent a renovation in 2018.

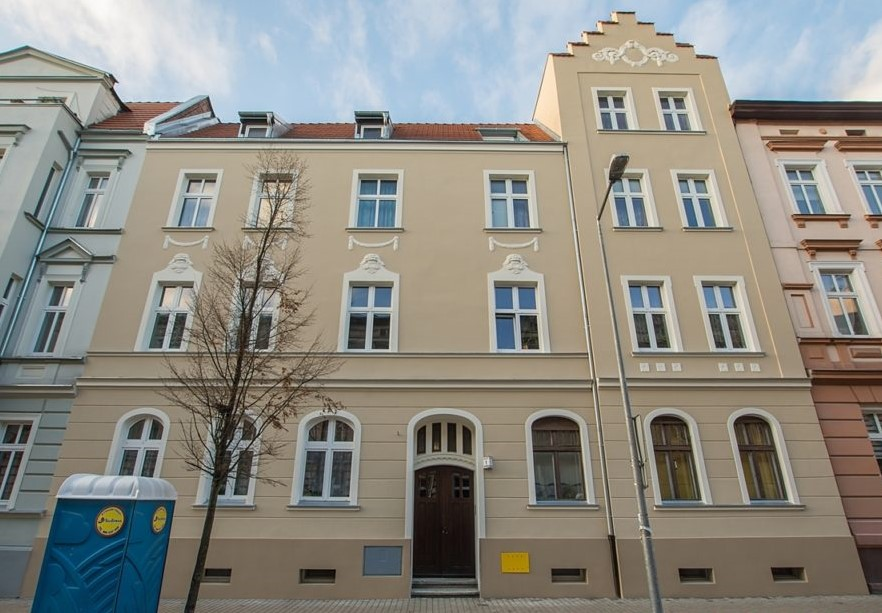
Main facade

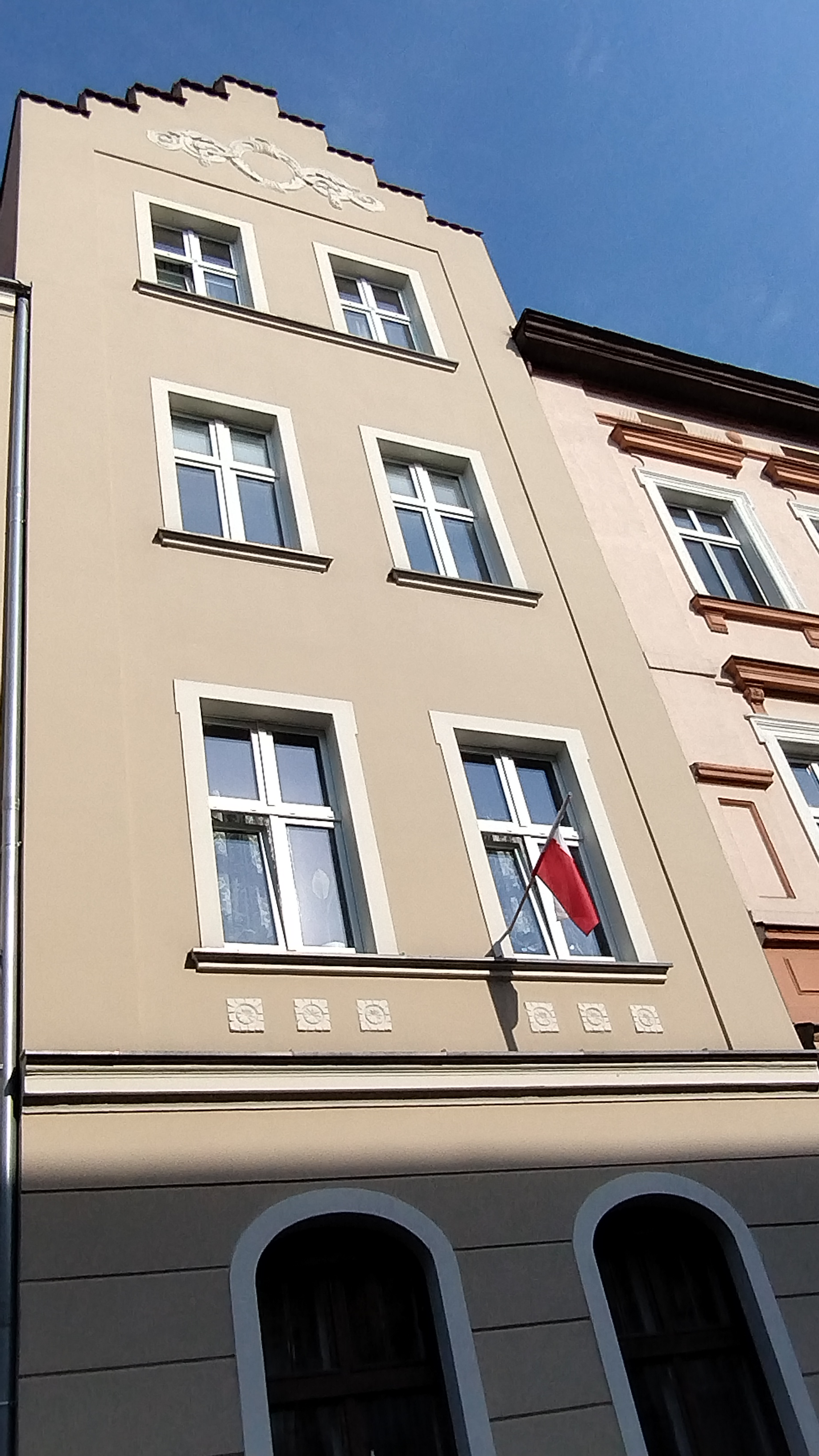
Motifs details

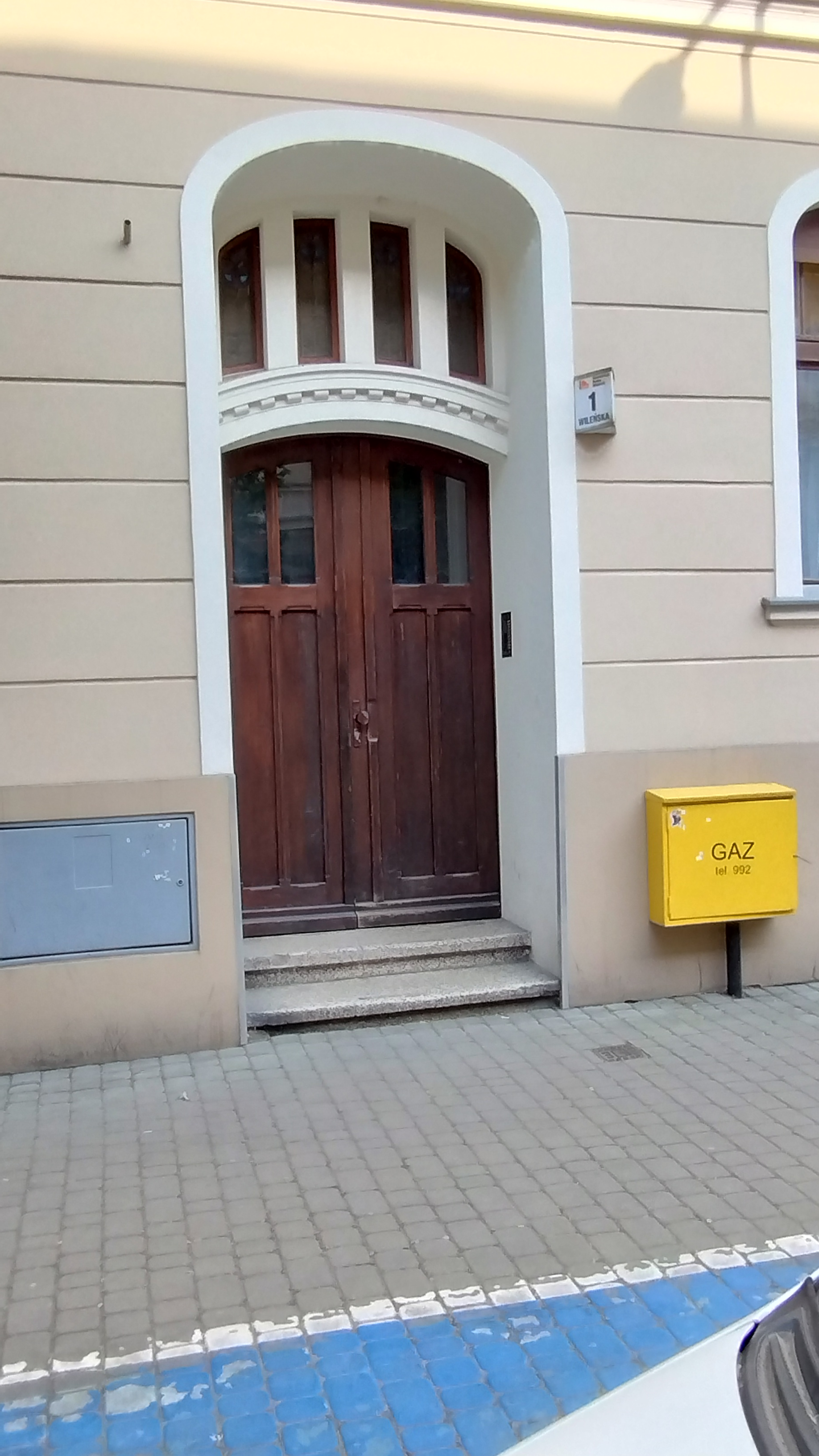
Main entrance

=== Tenement at 2 Wileńska street - 28 Chrobrego street ===
The tenement was initially registered as 1 Boiestraße. It was the property of Alexander Olszynski, a master carpenter, who also owned a second house in Wileńska street.

The renovation performed in 2019-2020 underlines the eclectic character of the architecture, with some delicate stucco cartouches on the first floor and below the eaves. The ensemble echoes in the best way the facing building at 11 Piastowski Square.

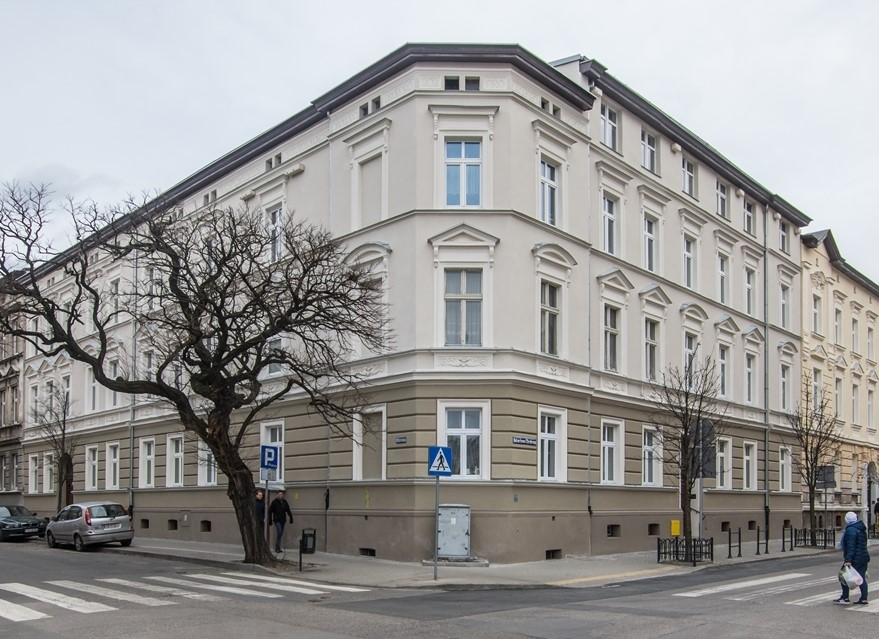
View of both elevations

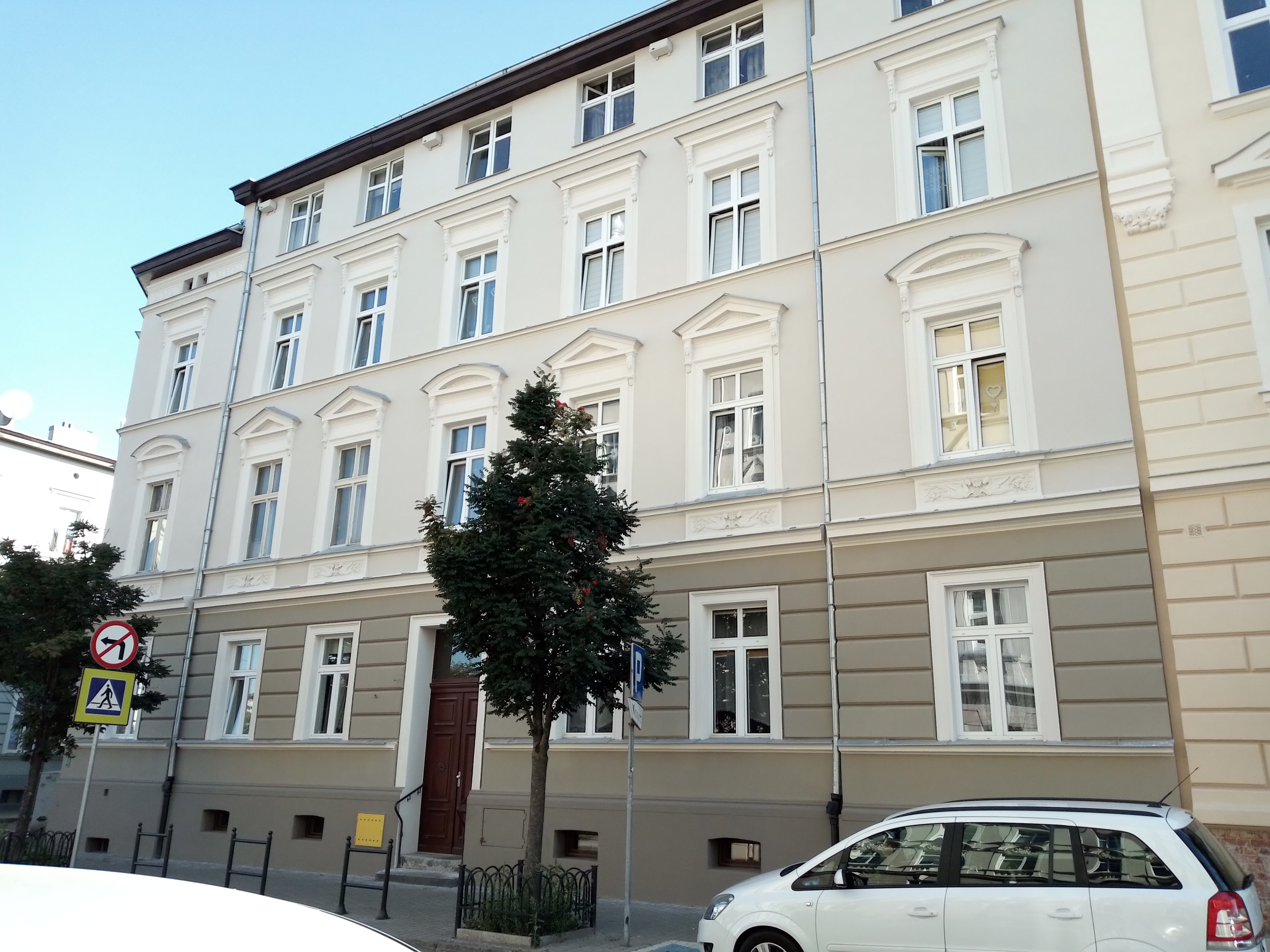
Frontage on Chrobrego street

=== Tenement at 3 ===
The first lay out of the street in the 1890s located the house at 5 Boiestraße. In the early 20th century, the Prussian horseshoe numbering marked it under the number 12. It had for first landlord Johann Bordanowicz, a butcher, and housed 5 families.

The tenement boasts eclectic features, in particular with the presence of two large balconies overhead the entrance flanked on each side by a couple of pilasters.

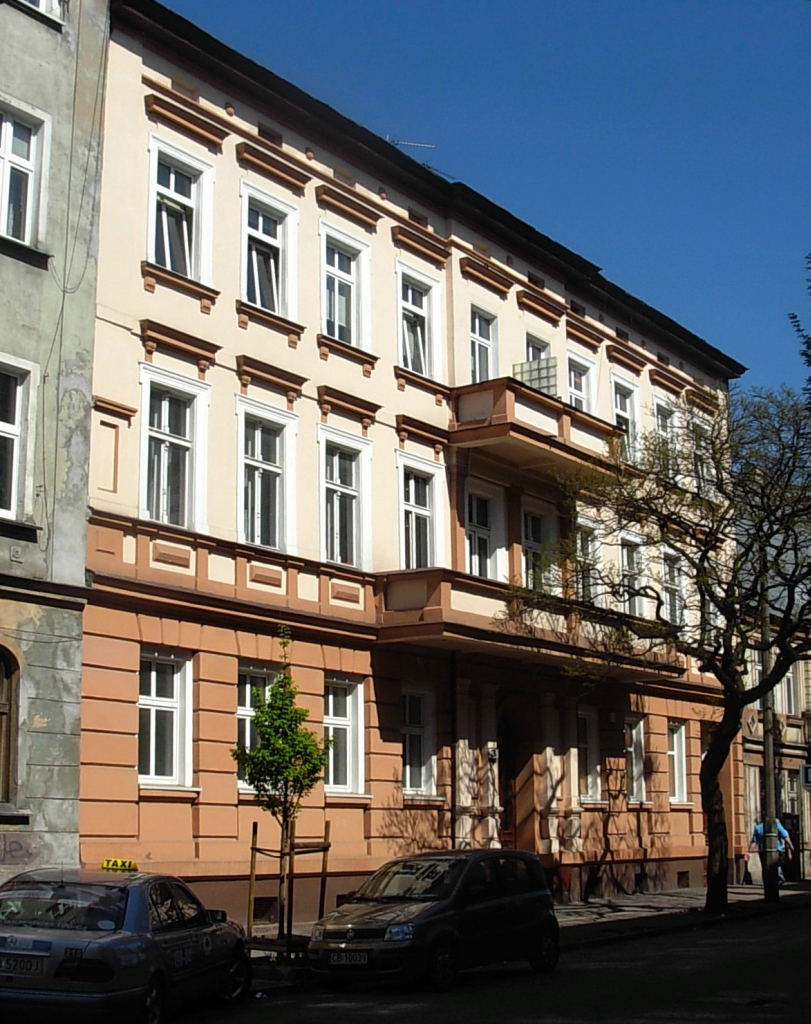
Frontage on the street

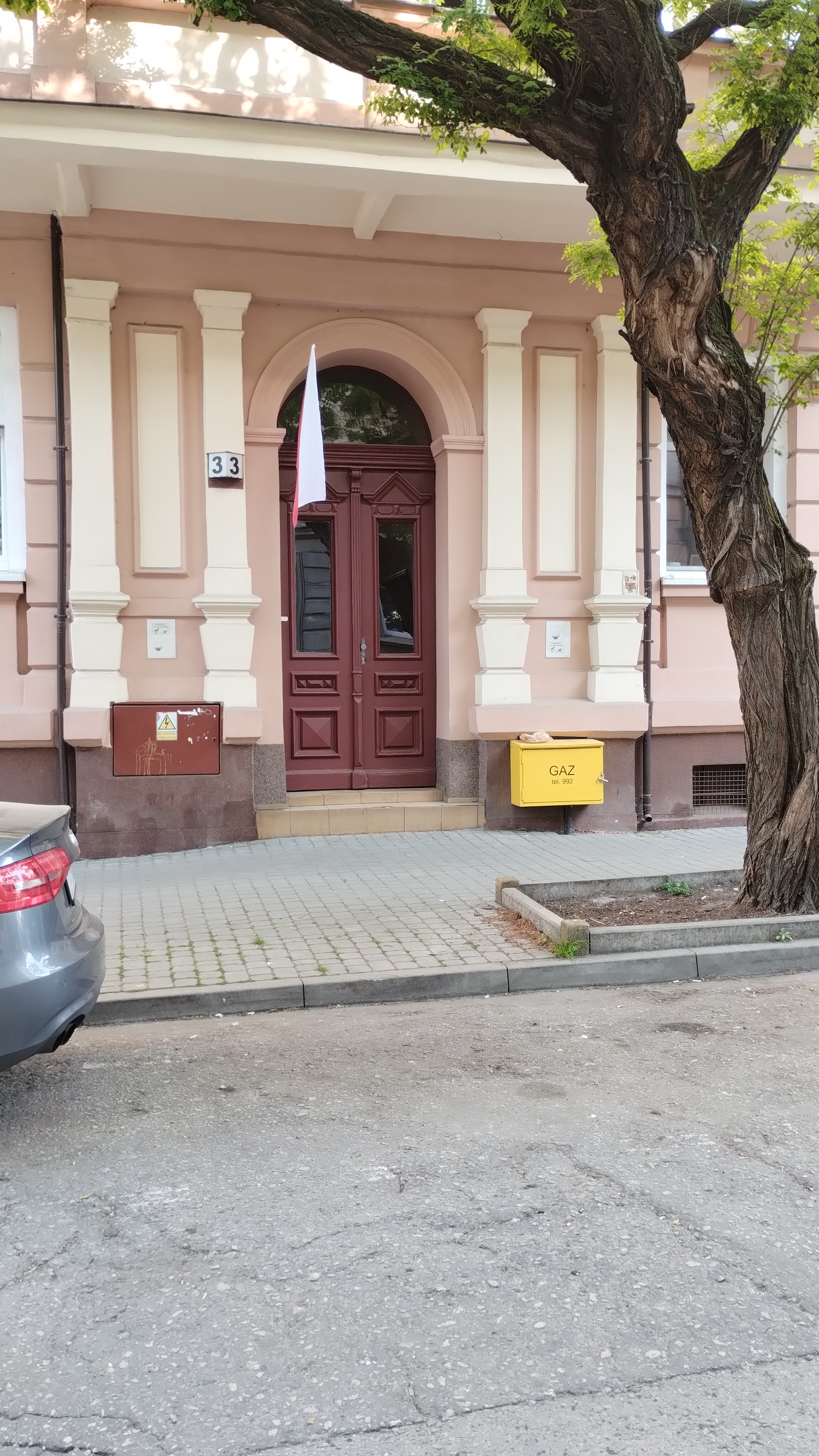
Main door

=== Tenement at 4 ===
The tenement was initially registered at 1 Boiestraße, before bearing the number 2 when the abutting corner tenement was constructed. It was the second building owned by Alexander Olszynski, a master carpenter. From the beginning of the 20th century till the late 1930s, the tenement housed a saddler, Carl Nuszkowski.

One can highlight the wrought iron grille fence that close the entrance to the backyard, as well as the corbel table running on the top of the facade.

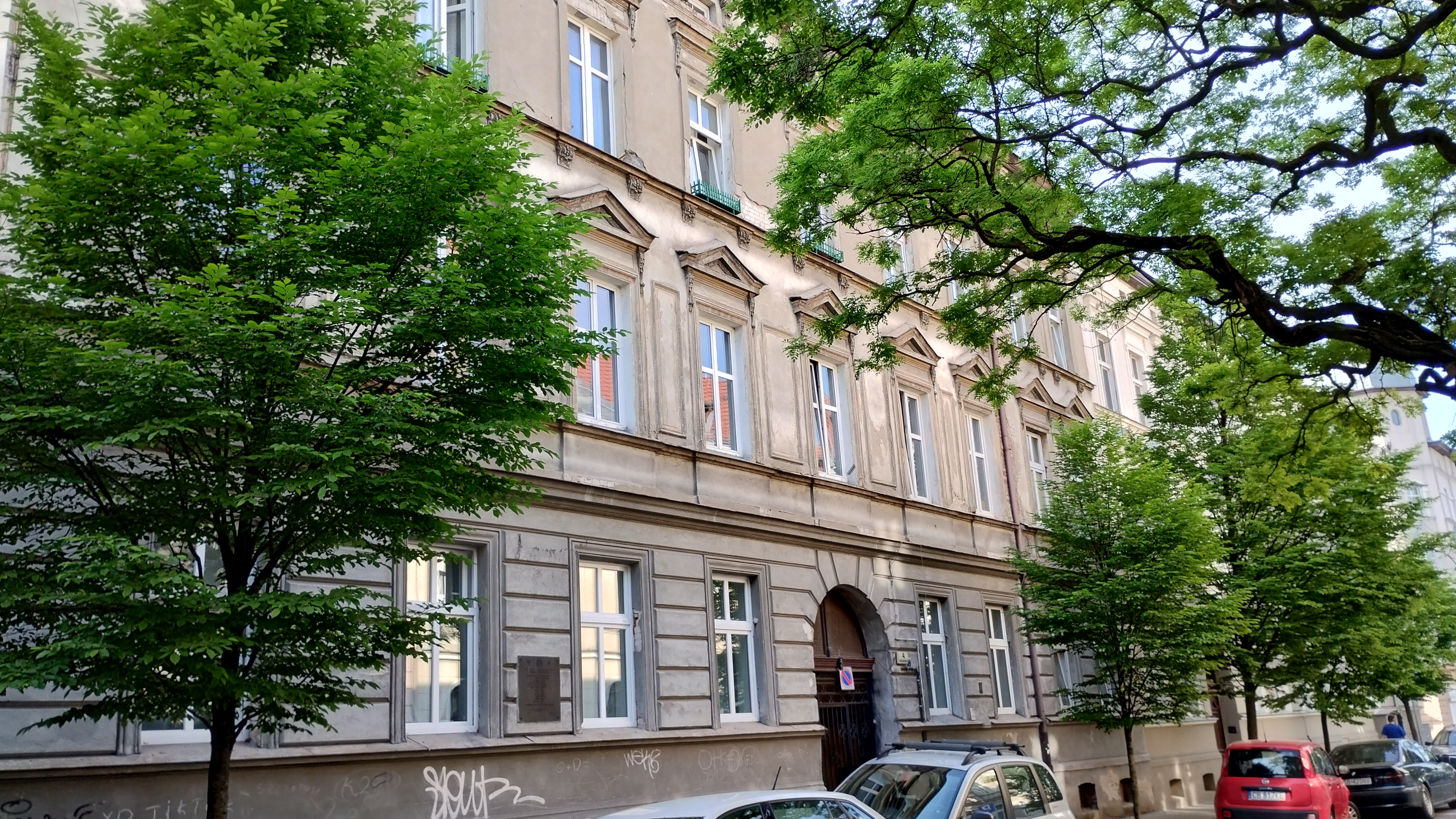
Main facade

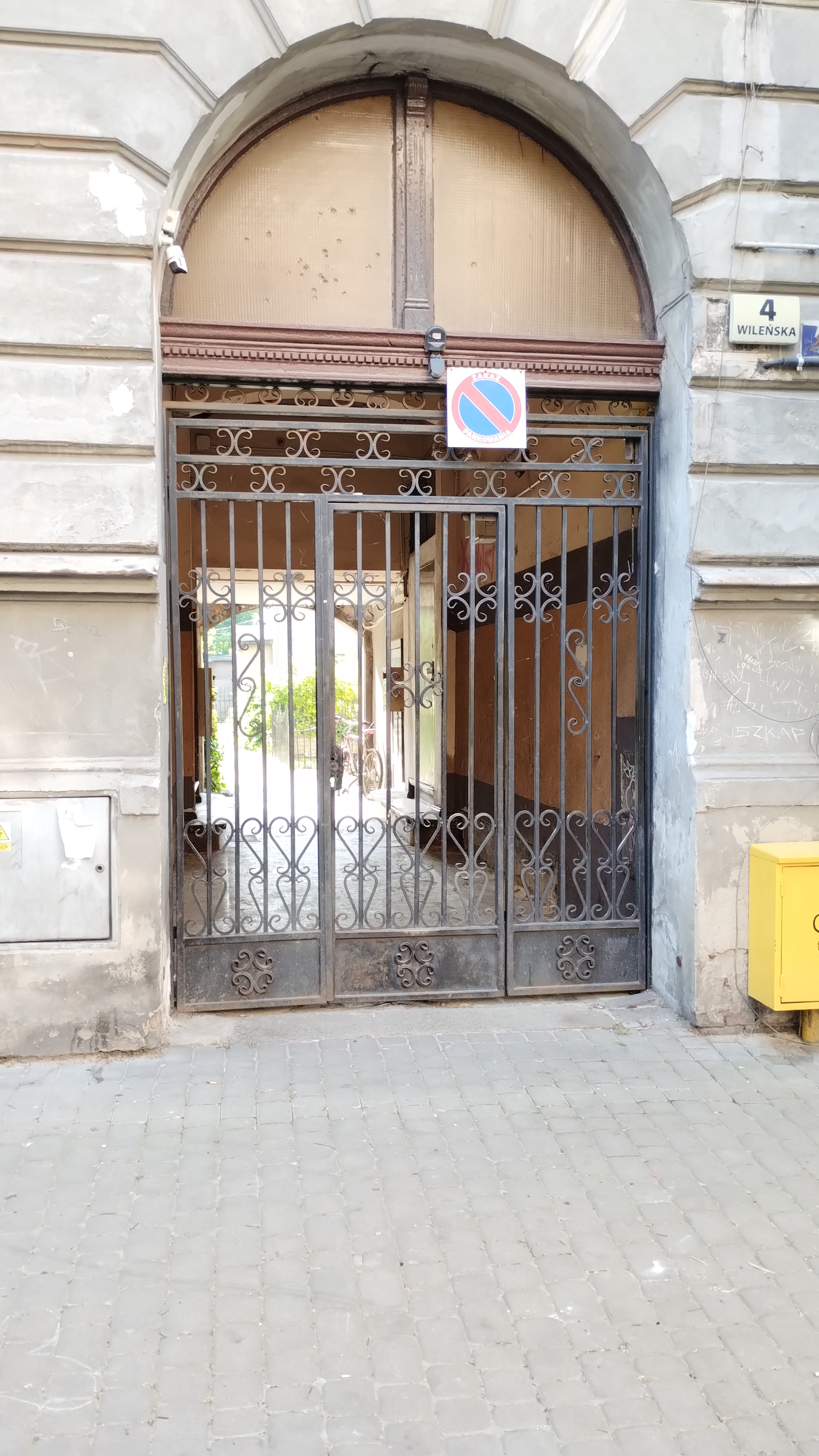
Door on the street

=== House at 5 ===
The villa was first owned by Otto Tarnów, working in a post office. He previously lived nearby, at 22 Elizabeth Straße (now 43 Śniadeckich street). The building had 6 successive landlords before the start of WWI.

The house, renovated in 2014, is specifically remarkable by the presence of blue tiles on the ground floor of the facade. This design is reinforced by the other punctual blue tiles in the cartouches or around the top round stuccoed pediment. One can also mention the wrought-iron balcony overhead the main street entrance. The house is located under the 18th Meridian East, running through the city and crossing the Old Market Square.

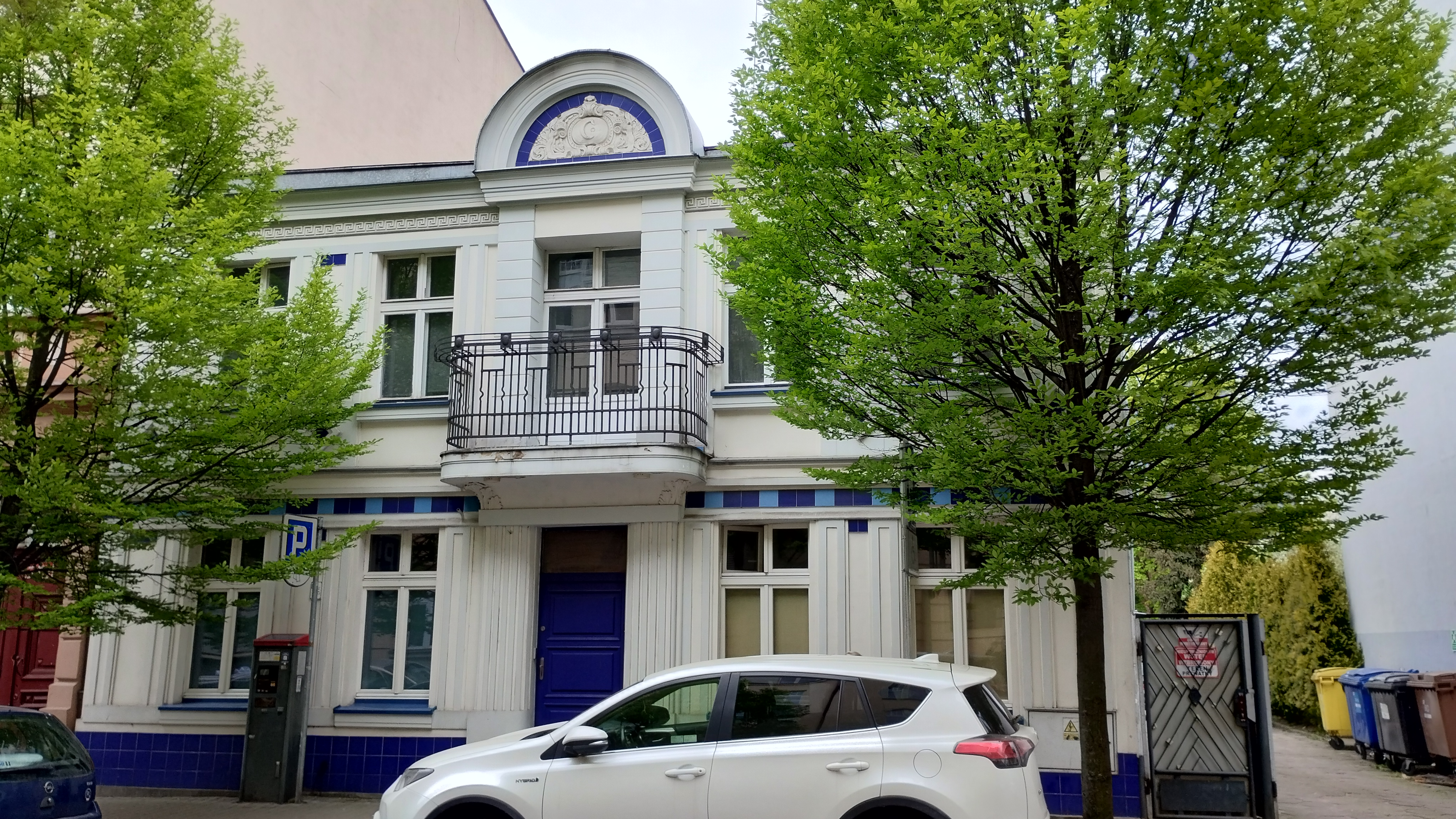
View from the street

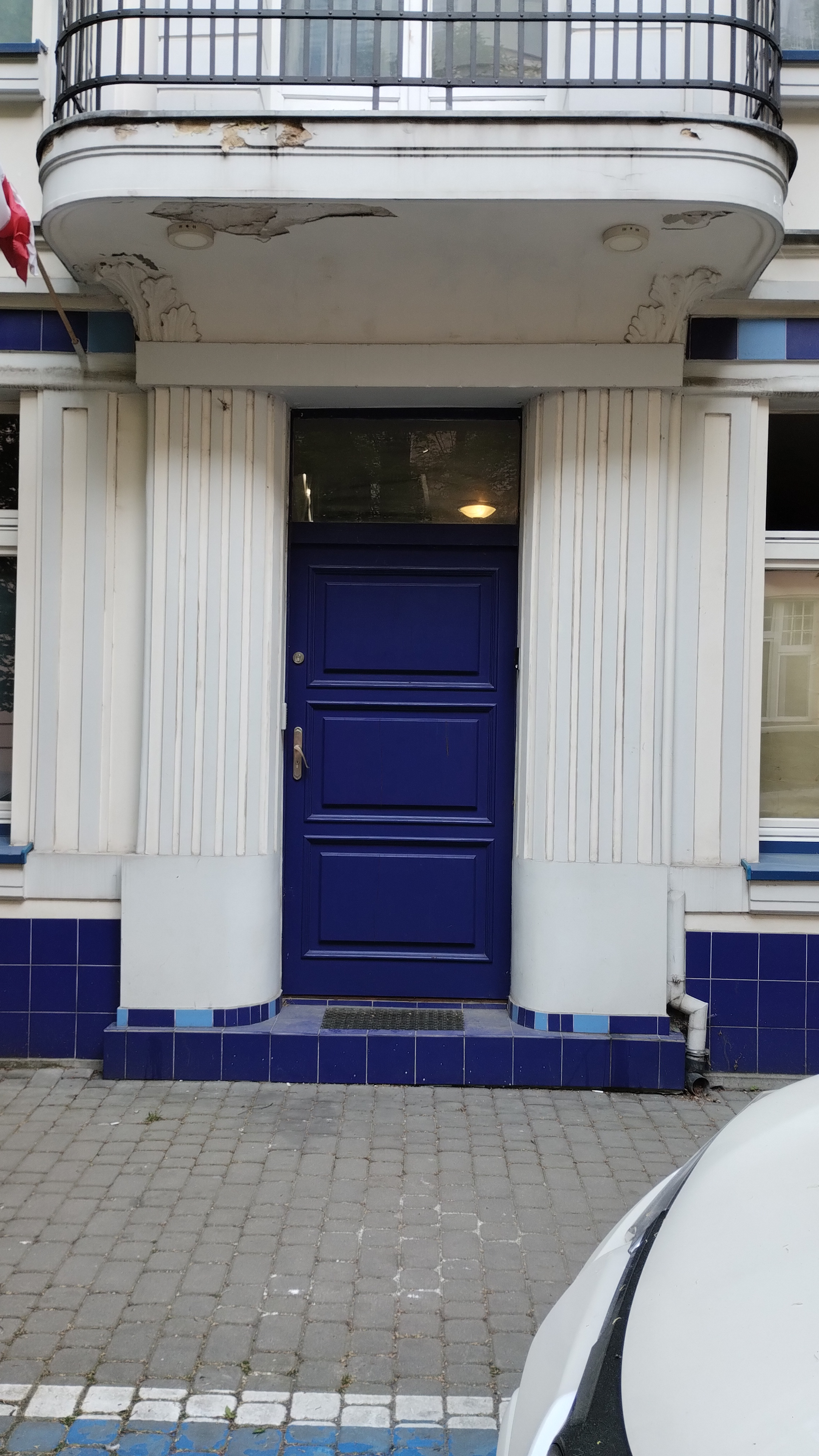
Main entrance

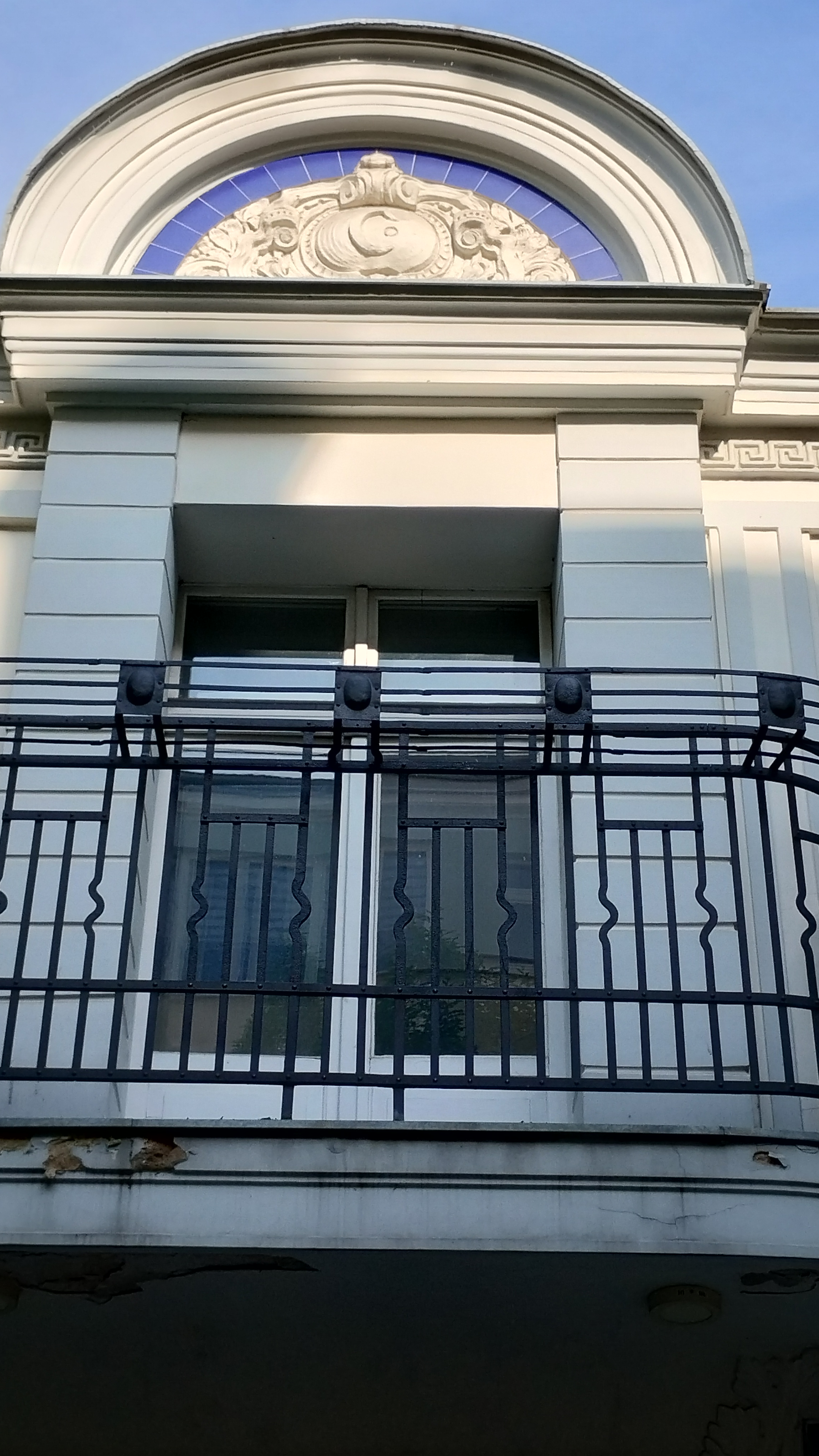
Top pediment

=== Marian Rejewski tenement at 6 ===
Constructed at then 3 Boiestraße, the building had for first landlord Richard Schramke, an interior painter. A year later, Marian Rejewski was born there, from Józef and Matylda in a merchant family. Marian (1905–1980) became a mathematician and cryptologist who in late 1932 reconstructed the sight-unseen German military Enigma cipher machine. A commemorative plaque to him is now standing on the tenement wall.

The large facade features a myriad of Art Nouveau plastered details and openings display varied shapes. The frontage symmetry is only unbalanced by the square bay window flanked by two balconies.

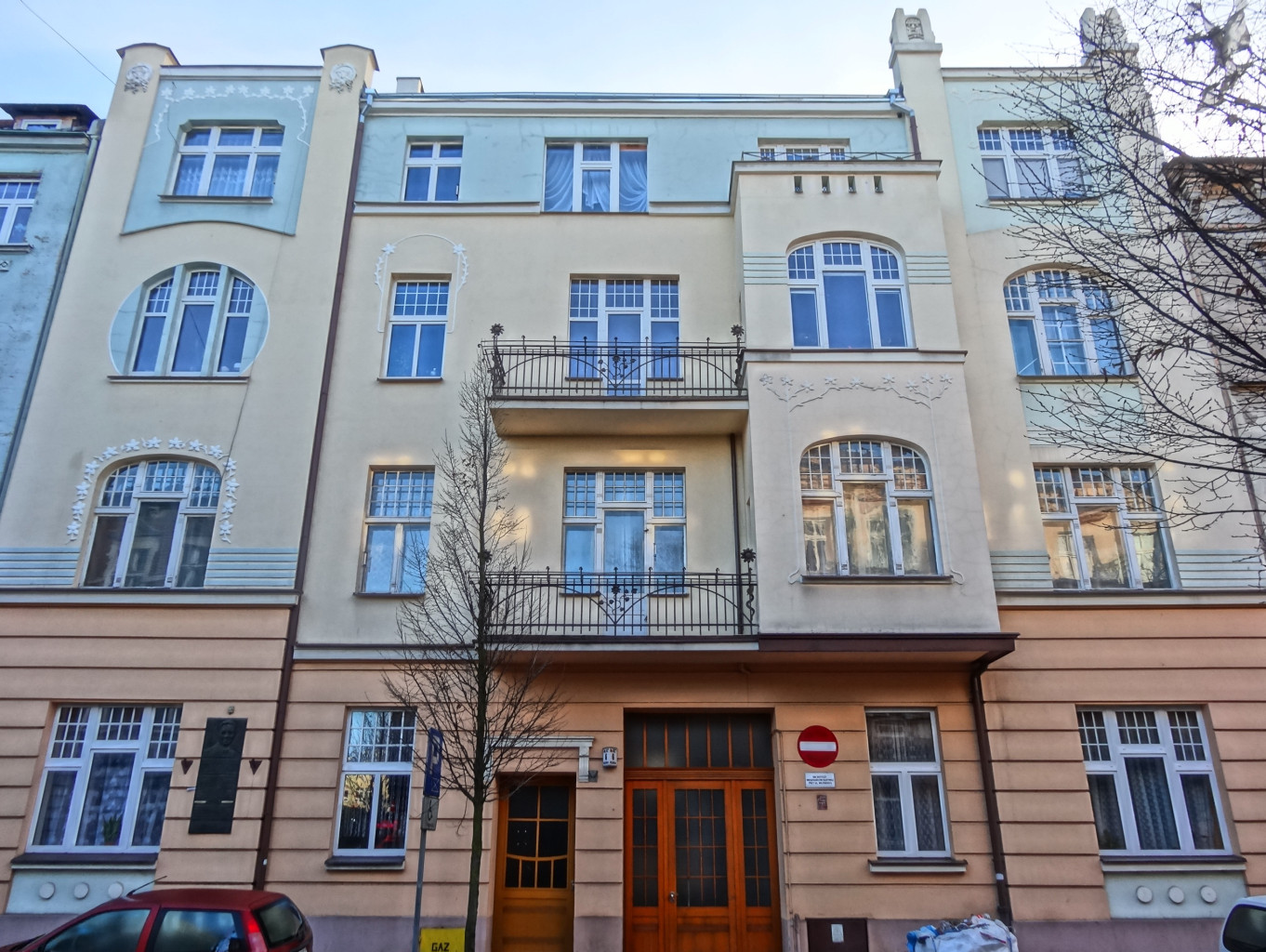
Main frontage

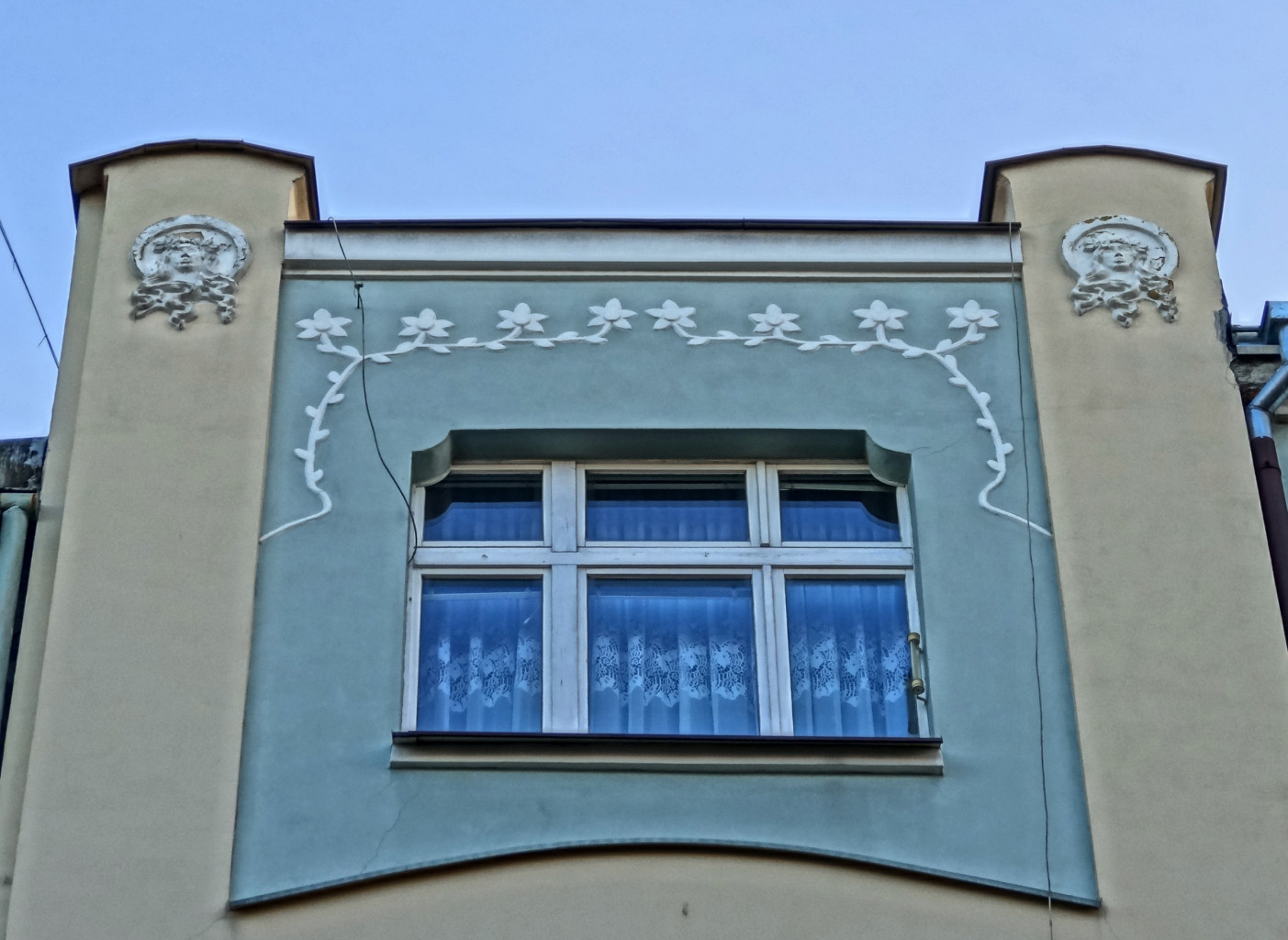
Art Nouveau motifs

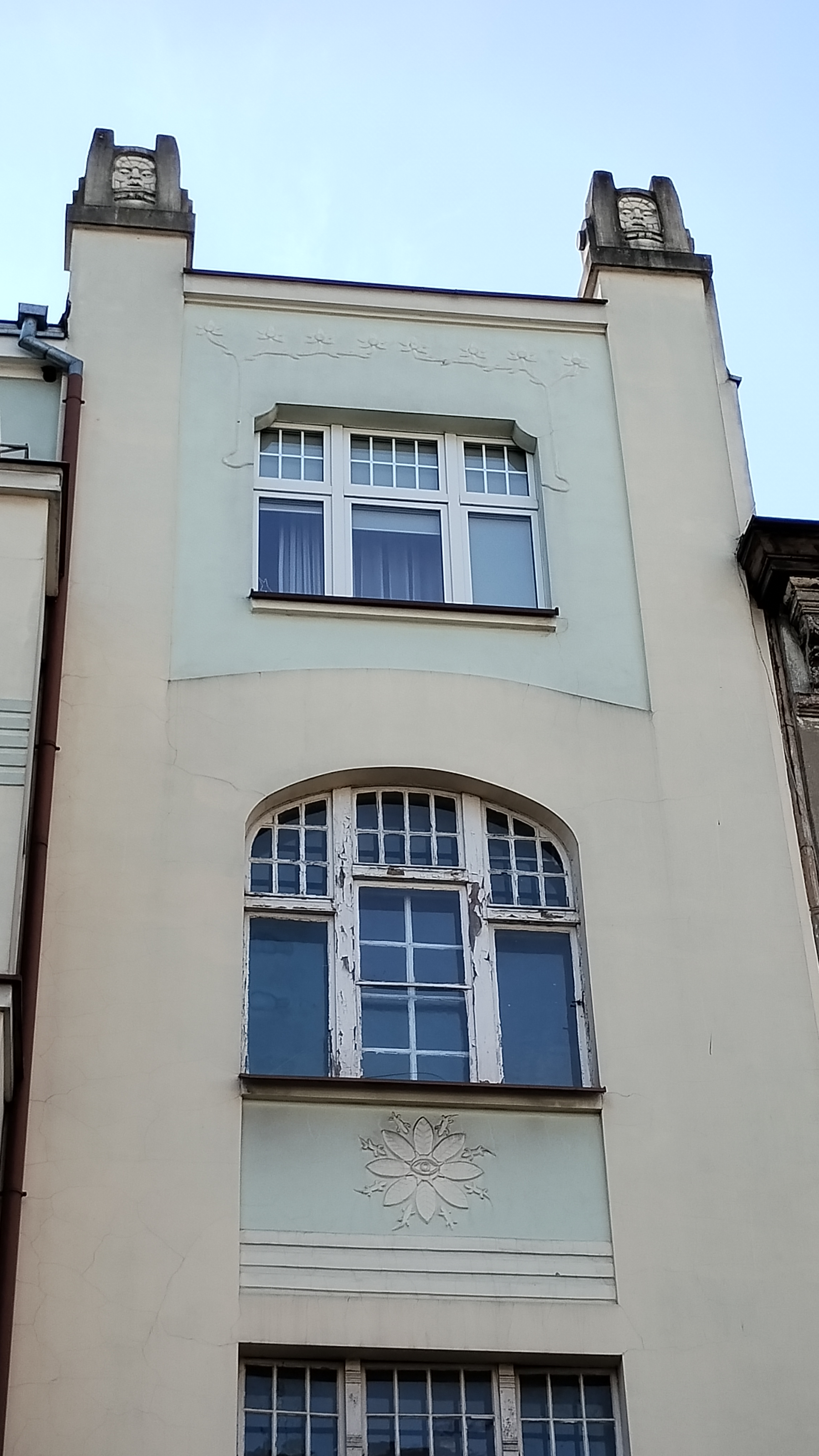
Art Nouveau motifs

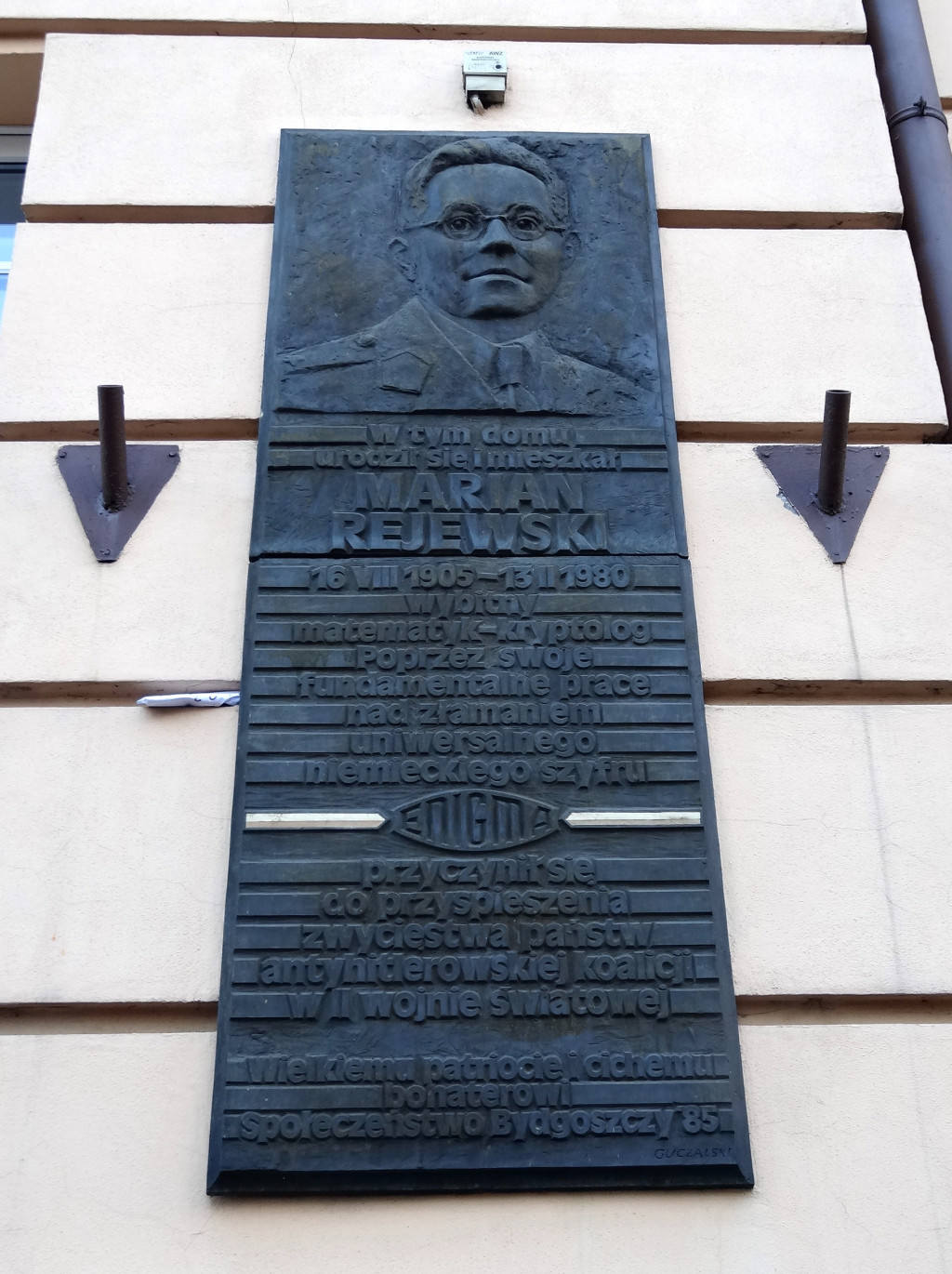
Commemorative plaque to Marian Rejewski

=== Tenement at 7 ===
1895

Eclecticism

Franz Machalinski owned the building and earned a living by letting the flats there.

In its details, the tenement boasts eclectic, close to Neo-baroque, style. One can notice, among others the two wrought iron balconies, the heavily decorated pediment crowning the middle top opening as well as the corbel table running under the roof.

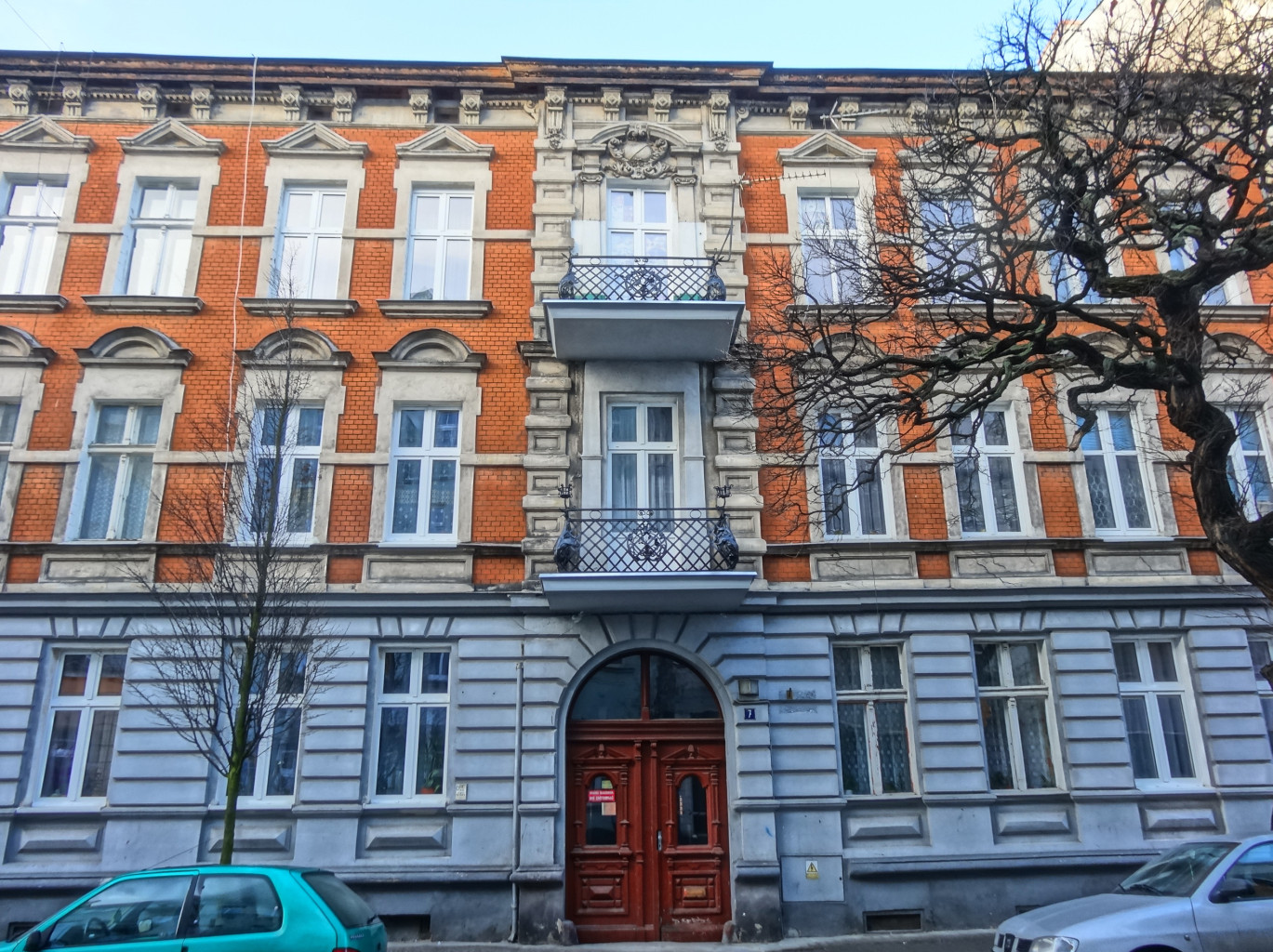
Main frontage

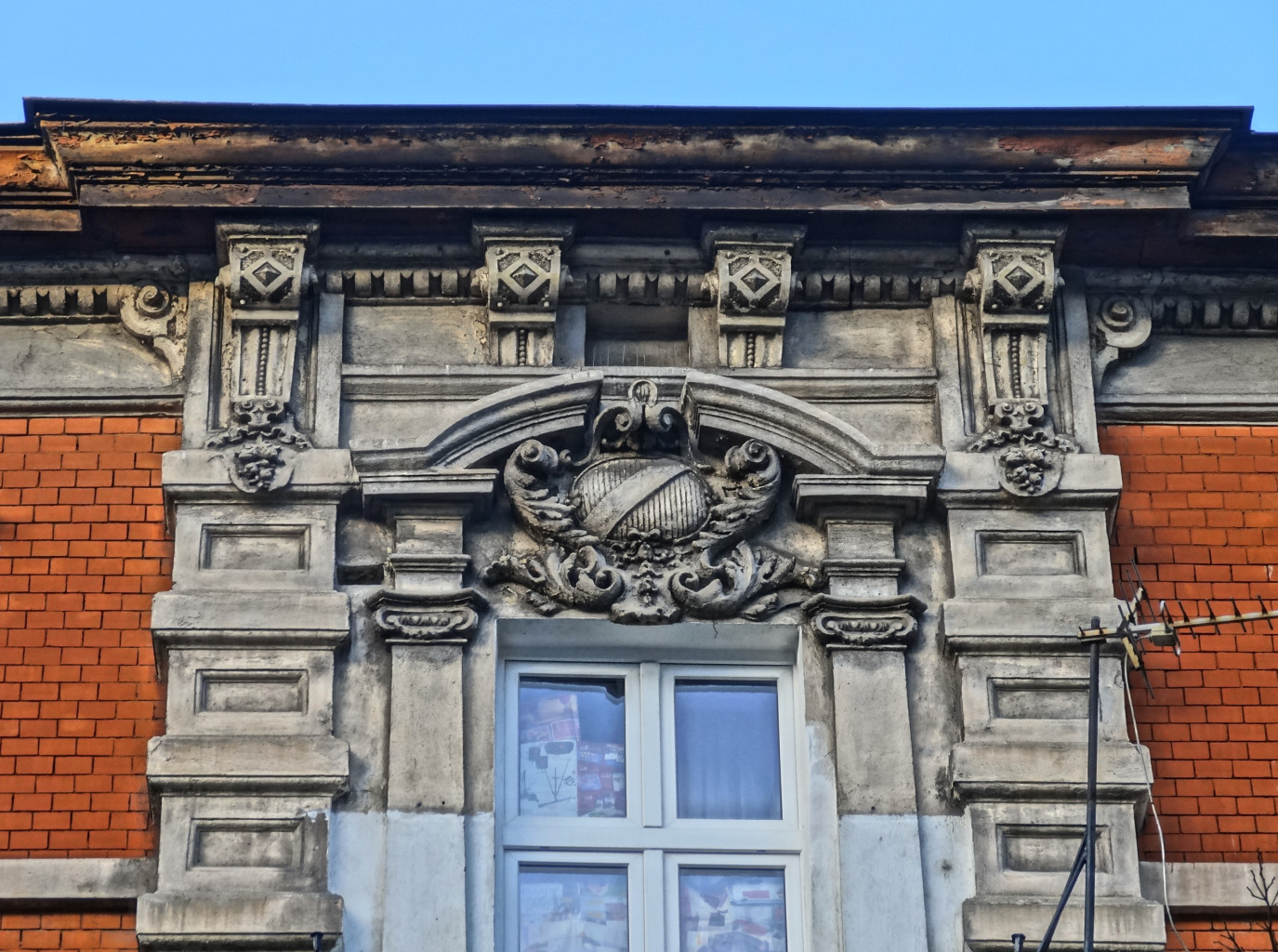
Detail of the balcony pediment

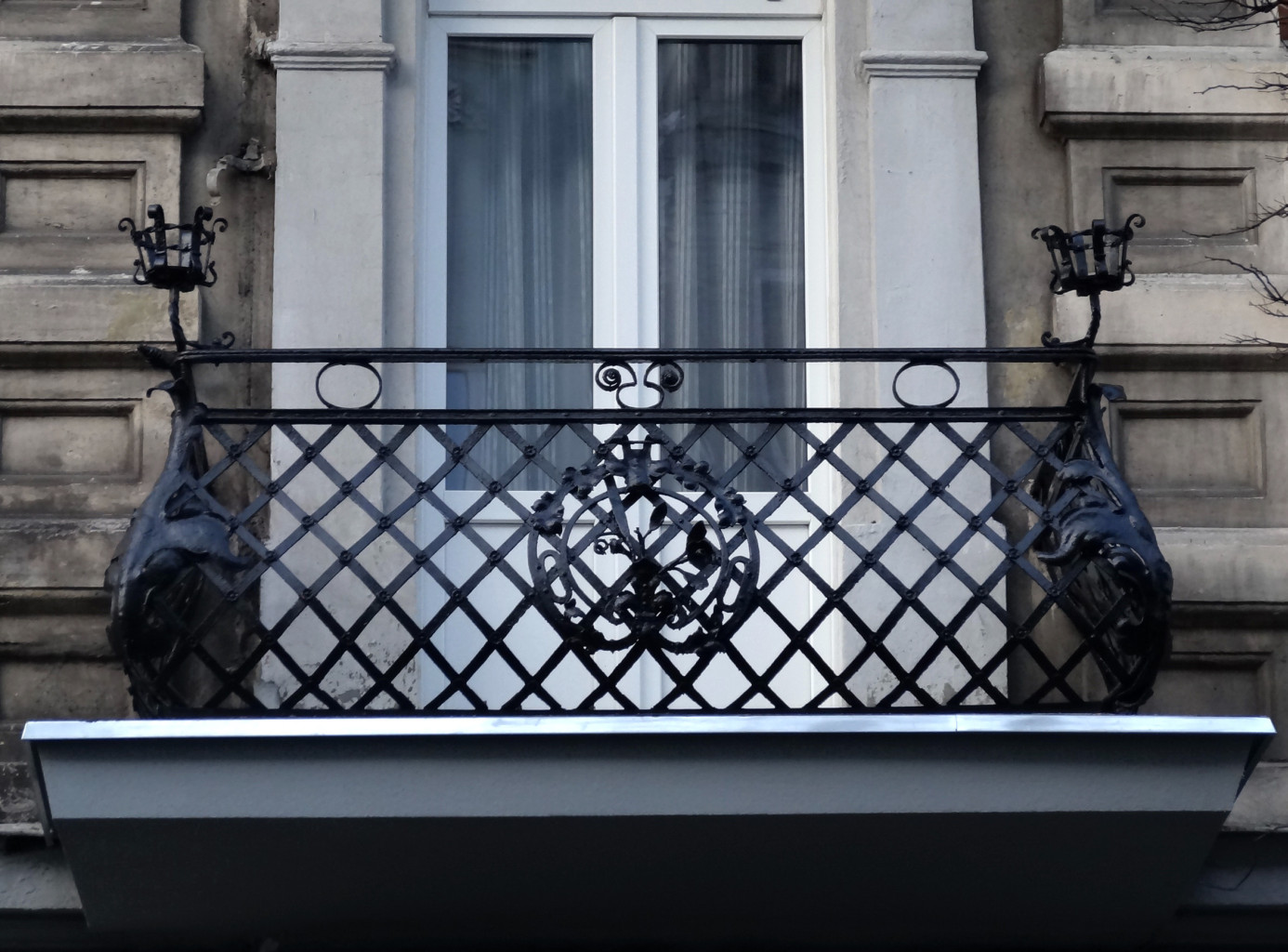
Wrought-iron fencing

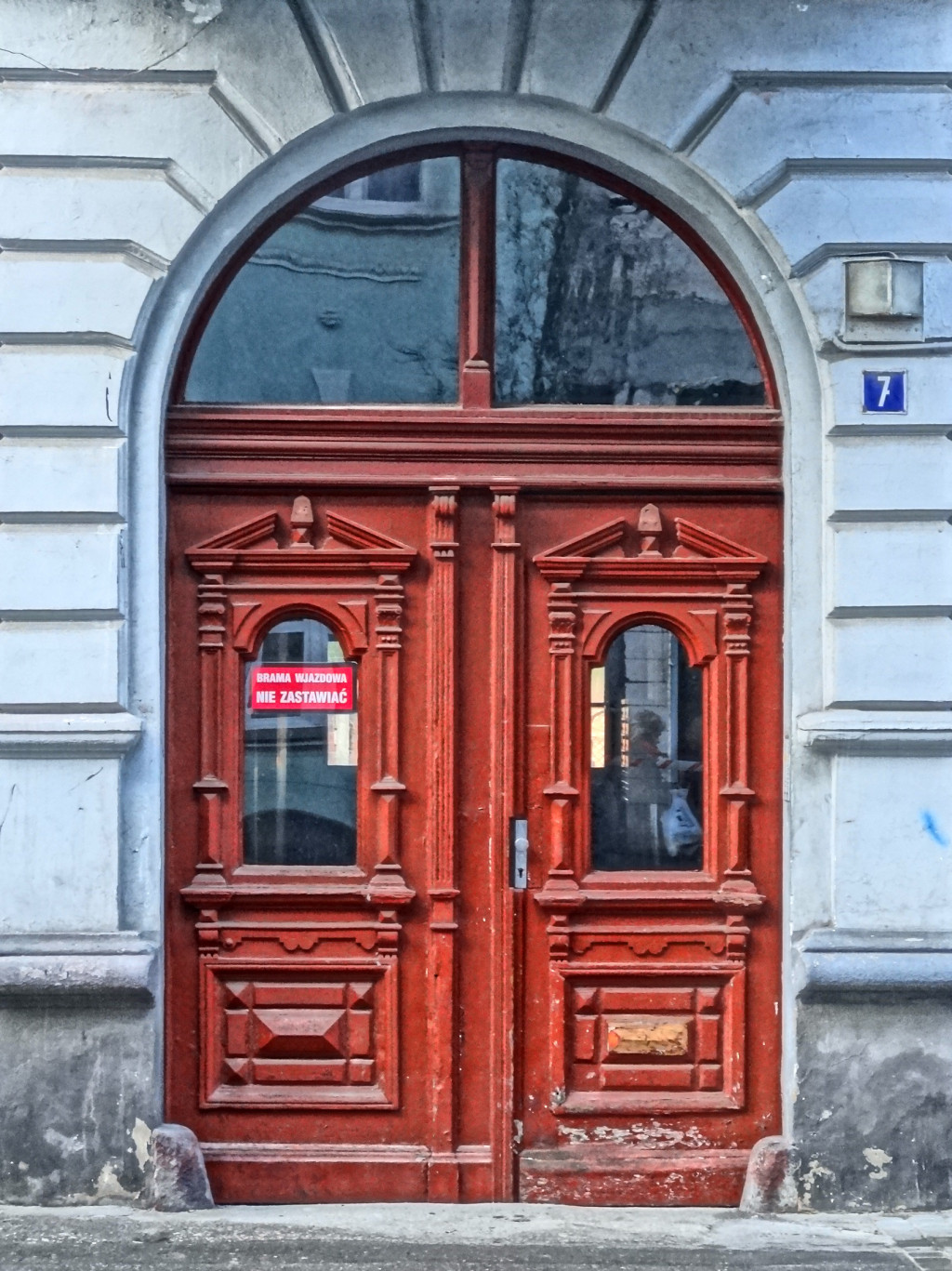
Entrance door

=== Tenement at 8 ===
1910, by Paul Prokopp

Art Nouveau

In the early 1910s, the unbuilt plot was owned by Adolf Dörfert, a merchant. Eventually, the current tenement was erected, with August Wehmut, a rentier, as landlord.

Refurbished in 2019, the building mixes Art Nouveau decoration elements and early modernist features (abondance of vertical lines and a geometric shaped wall gable).

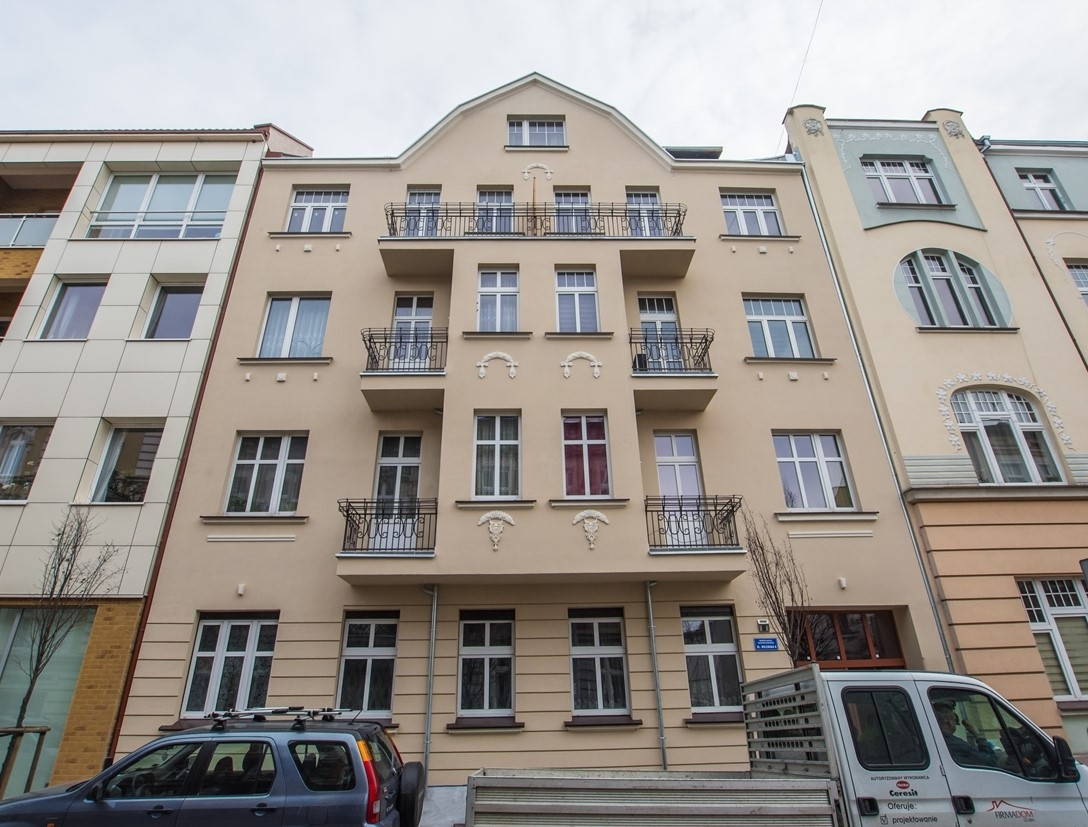
Renovated facade

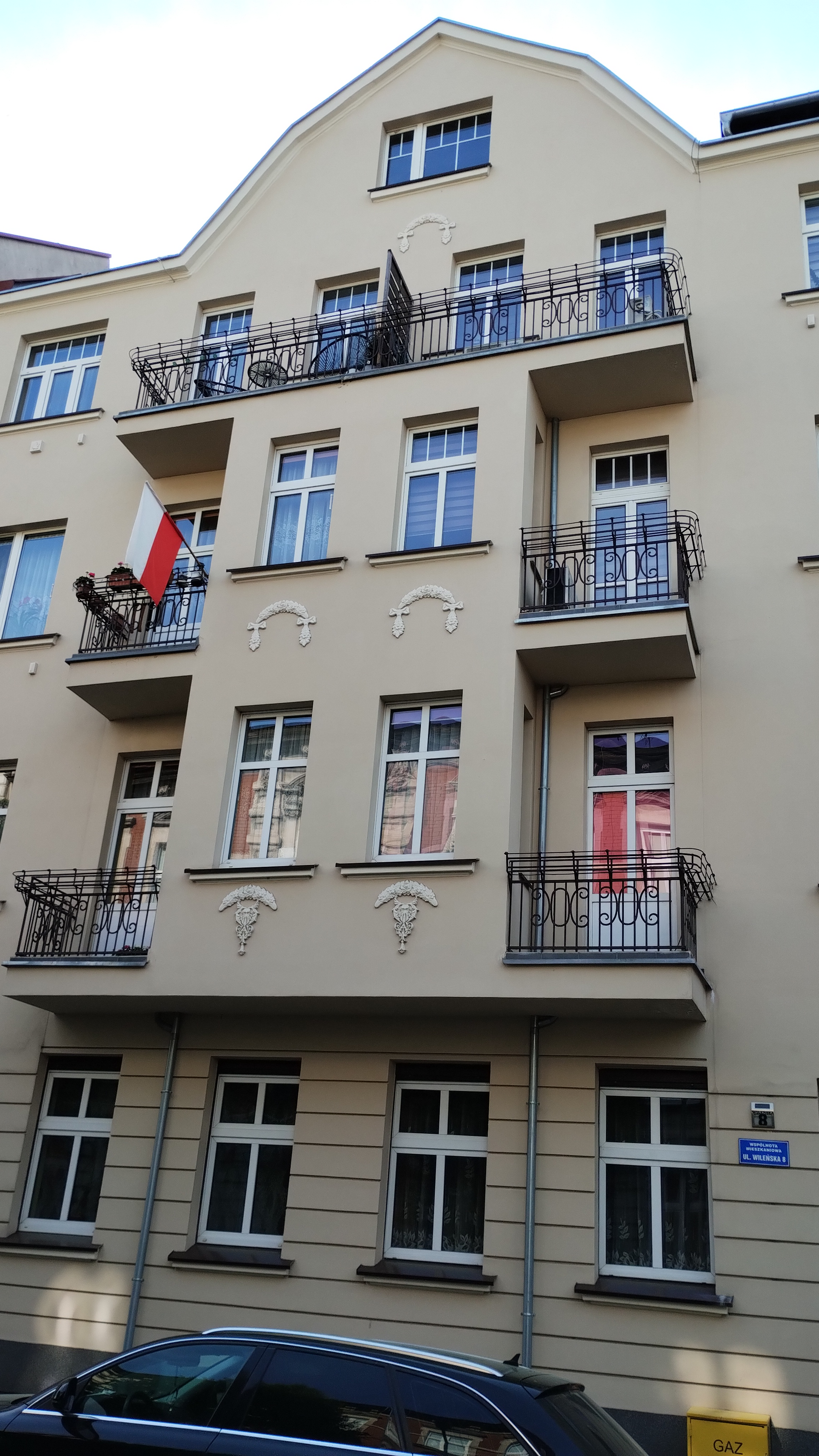
Bay-window

=== Tenement at 9 ===
The commissioner of the building was Hermann Uckel, a building contractor.

The building has a façade enriched with a plethora of decorative elements, from stuccoed pediments above the windows to bossage to triangular frontispieces bearing the interlaced letters U and H for Uckel Hermann, the first owner. This type of signature was common at the time, other instances can be found around downtown Bydgoszcz: Theonia Reichhardt House by Józef Święcicki, house at 22 Cieszkowskiego street by Fritz Weidner, tenement at 77 Dworcowa Street by Karl Bergner, house at 4 Szwalbego street.

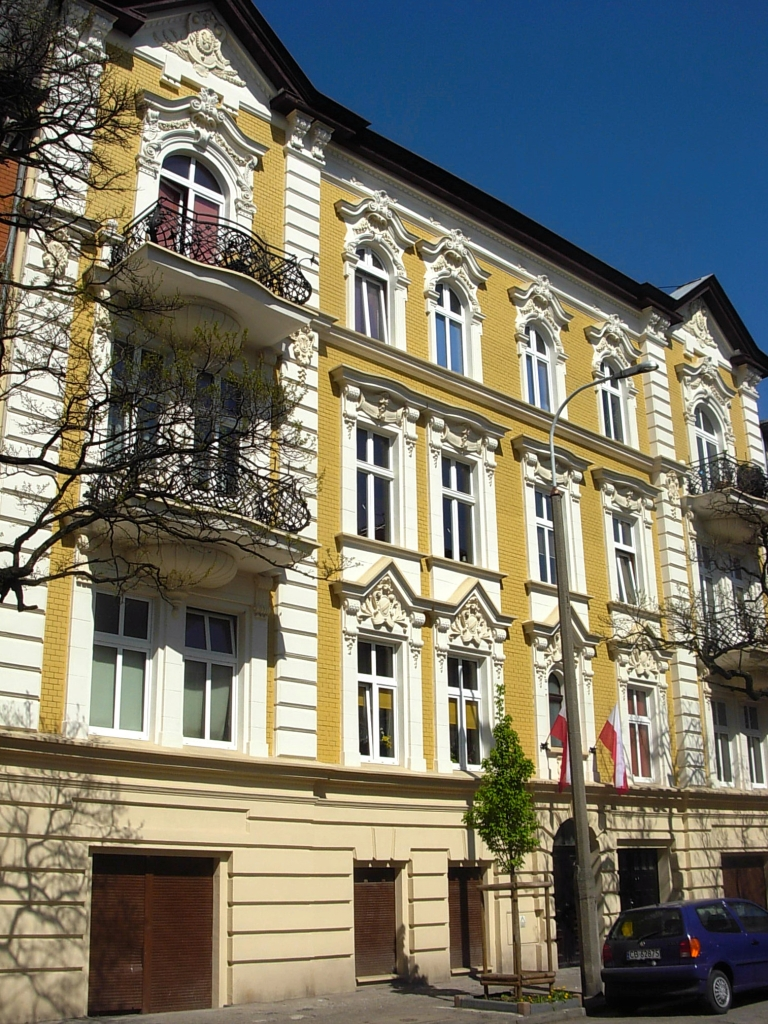
Main facade on the street

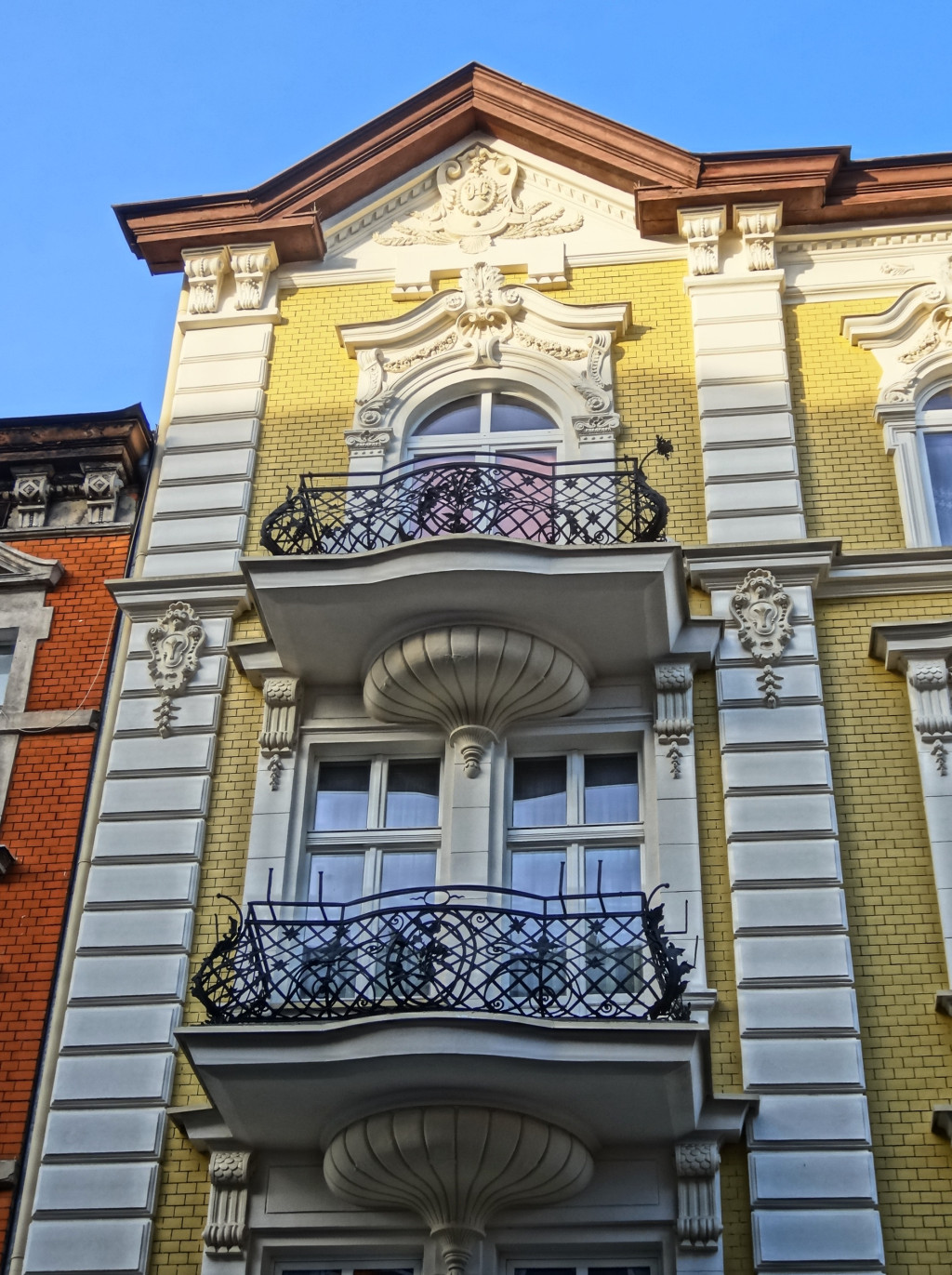
Adorned balconies

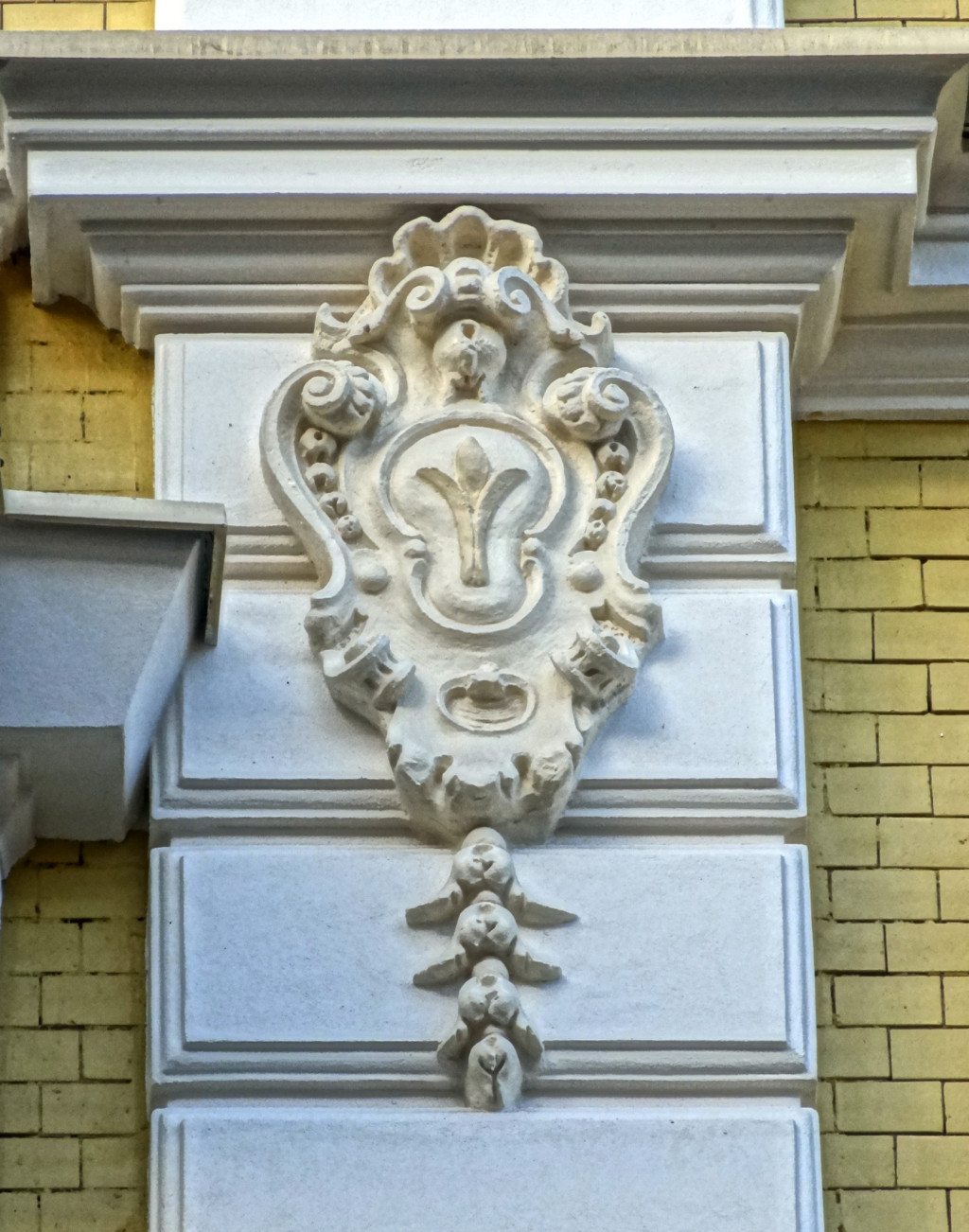
Plastered motif

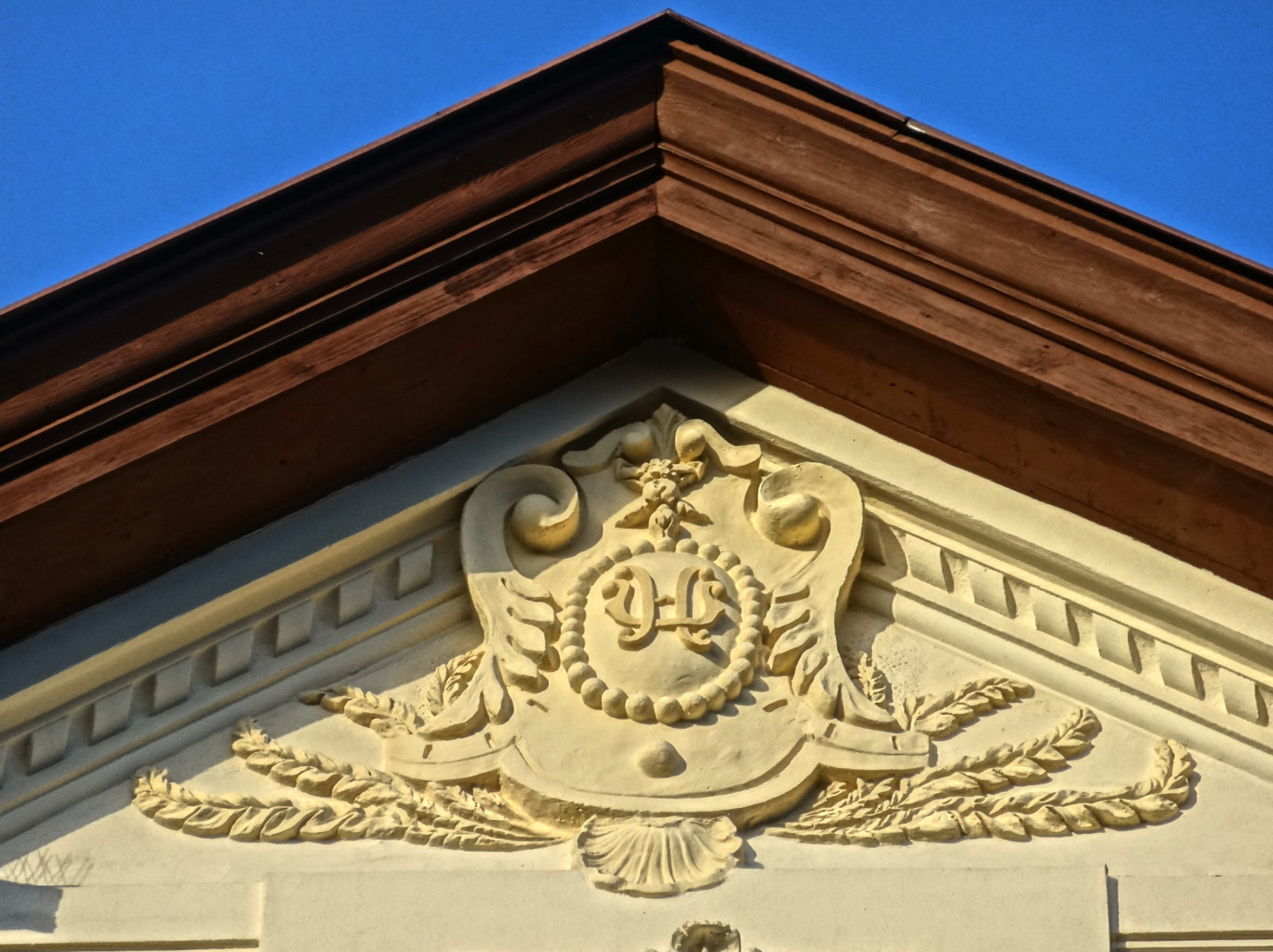
Frontispiece

=== Tenement at 11, corner with Mazowiecka street ===
Johann Bordanowicz, a butcher who already owned the building at N.3, was the first landlord of this tenement. At the time, it was located at the junction of Boiestraße and Heyne straße (present day Mazowiecka street).

Restored in 2017, the massive tenement displays two decorated facades on each street. The corner frontage features two heavy balconies.

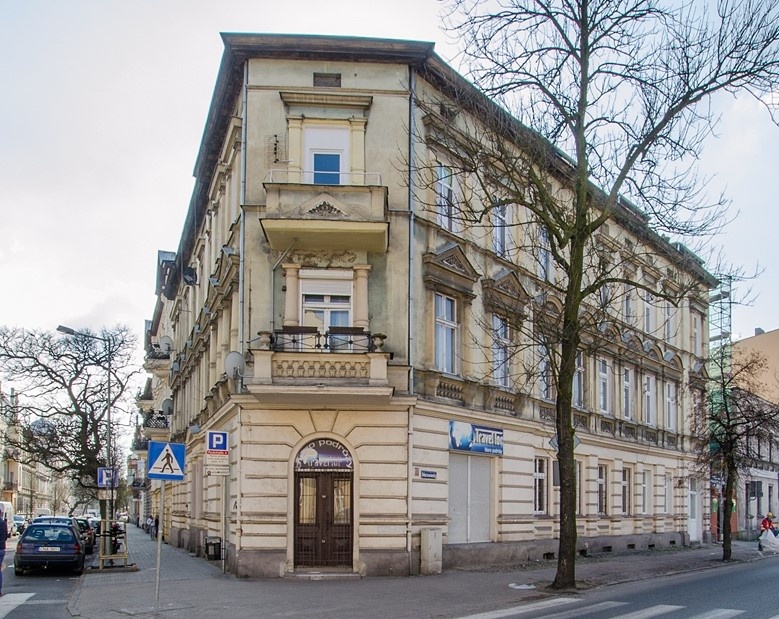
Facade seen from the street intersection

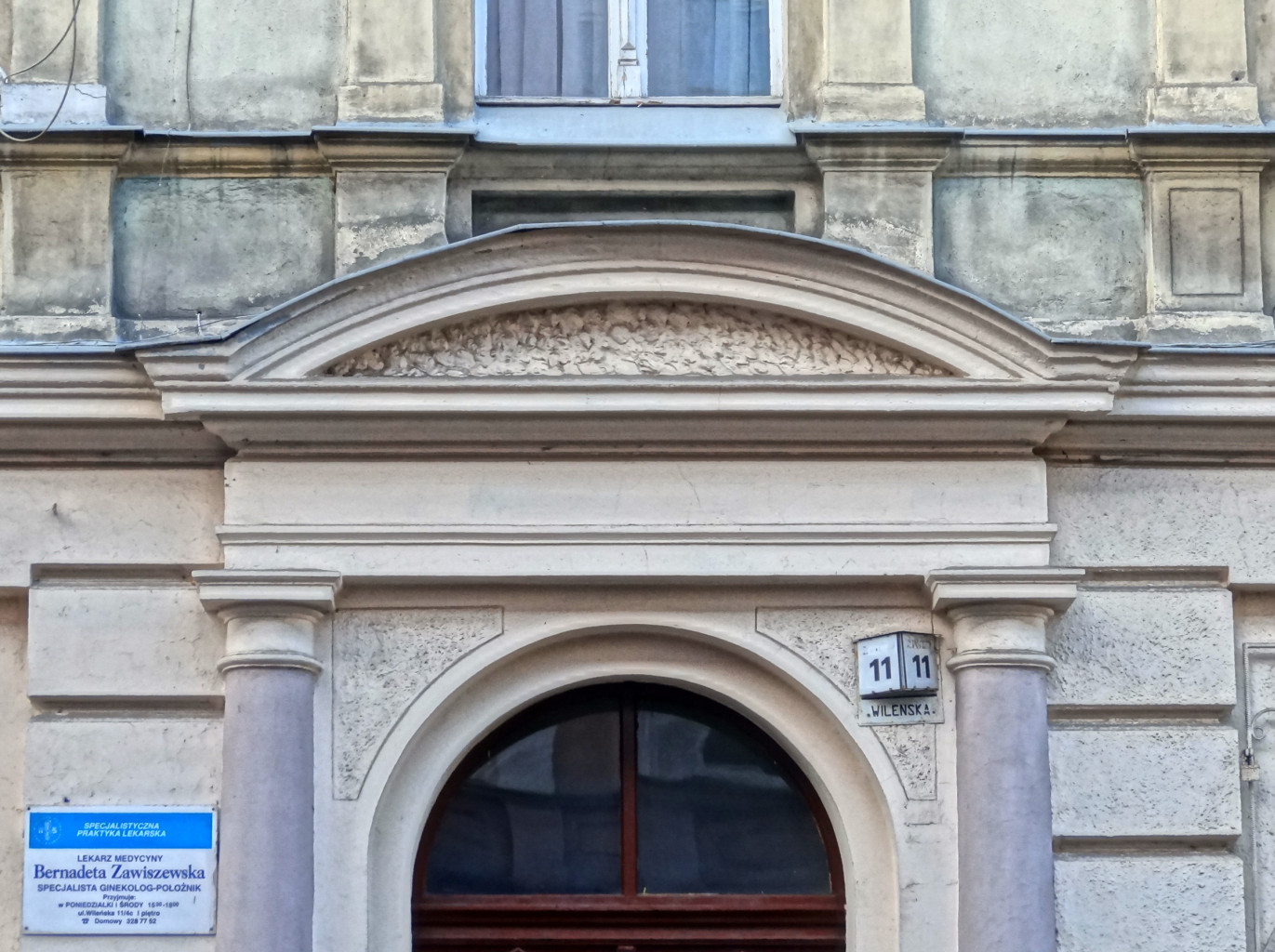
Pediment details

=== Tenement at 12 ===
Otto Kochanowski, a coppersmith, was the first owner of the tenement, first registered at 3 Boiestrasse His son Otto Jr. who lived at N.14, kept it till the early 1900s.

Renovated in 2014, one can highlight the main entrance adorned with a round transom light, topped by delicate stuccoed vegetal motifs.

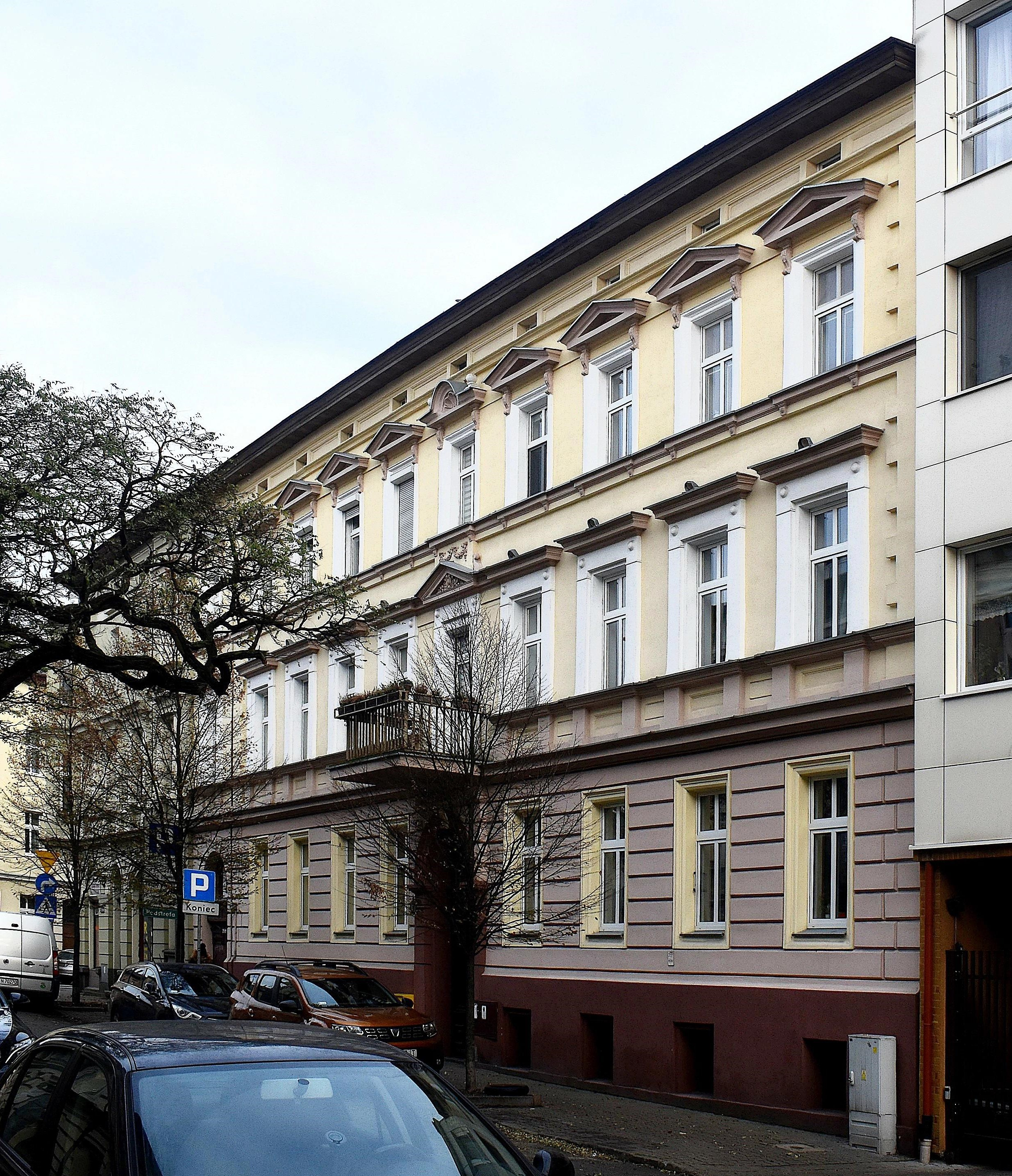
View of the frontage

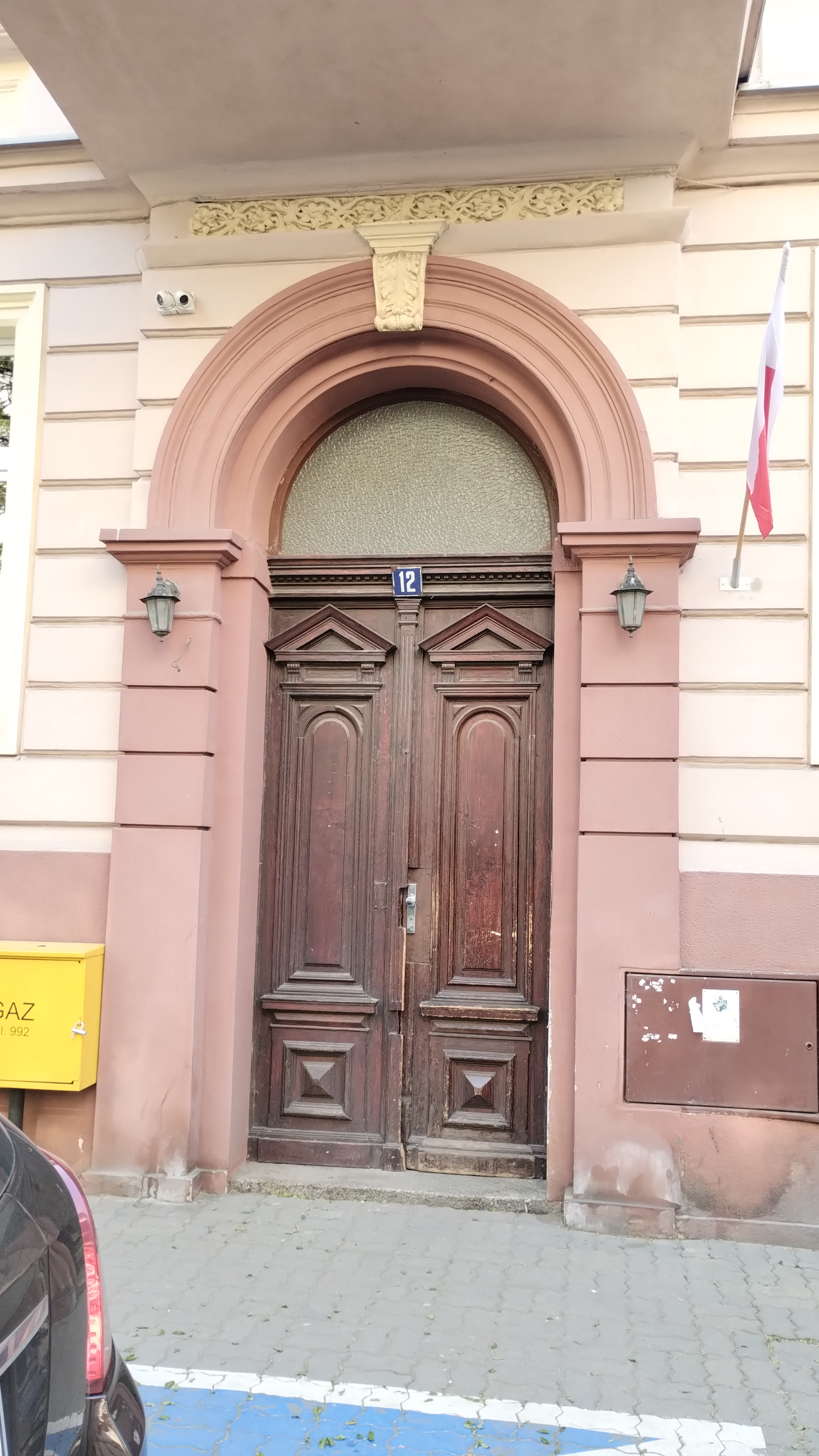
Main entrance

=== Tenement at 14, corner with Mazowiecka street ===
Registered on the Kuyavian-Pomeranian Heritage list.

Otto Jr. Kochanowski, the son of the coppersmith at N.12, was the first landlord. Otto Jr. was a building materials merchant. in 1896, he moved to a house at then 25 Mittelstasse (modern-day Sienkiewicza Street).

The city heritage building boasts two decorated facades and a large corner bay window stretching on two levels.

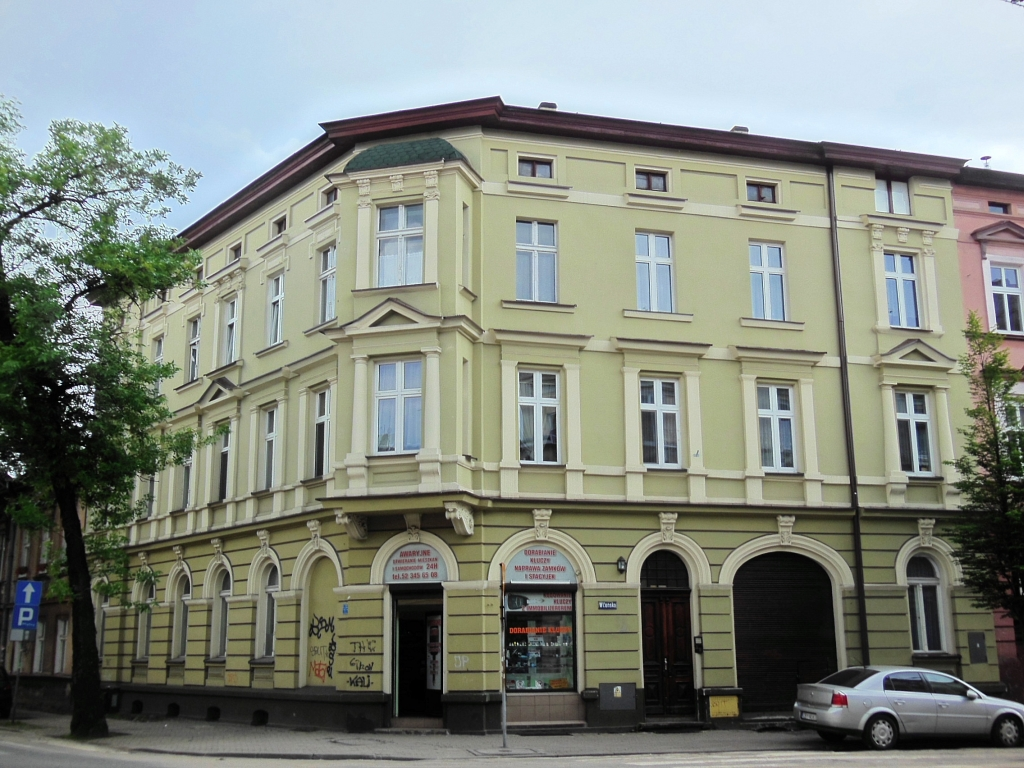
Corner view

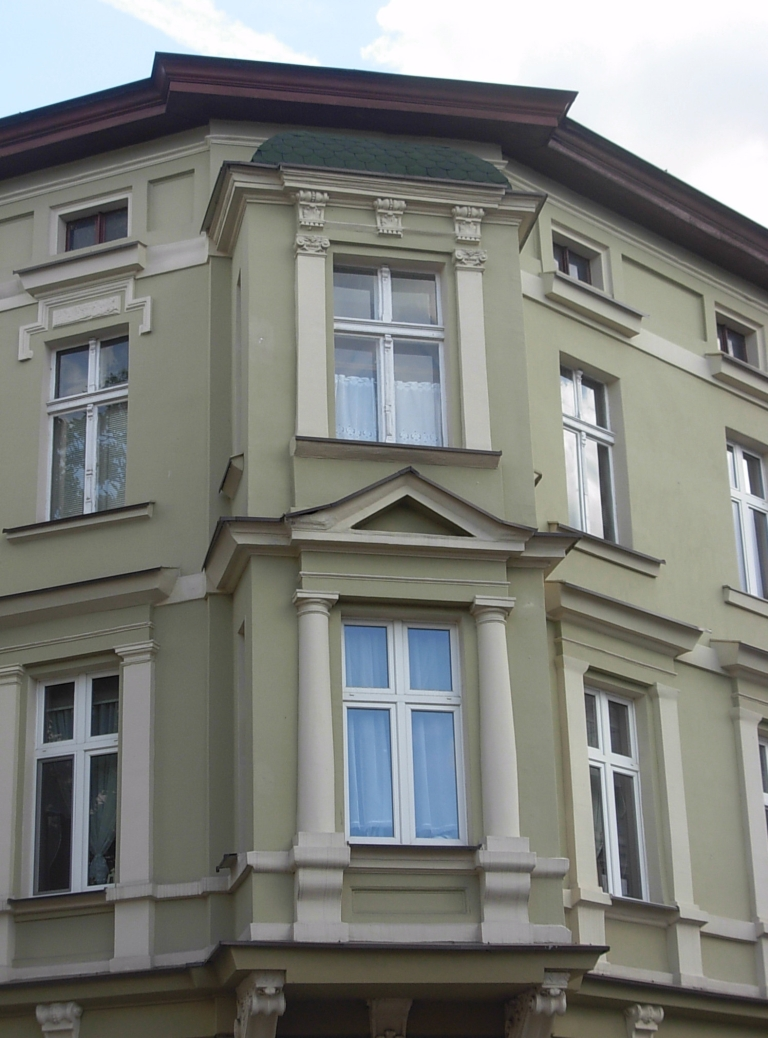
Corner bay window

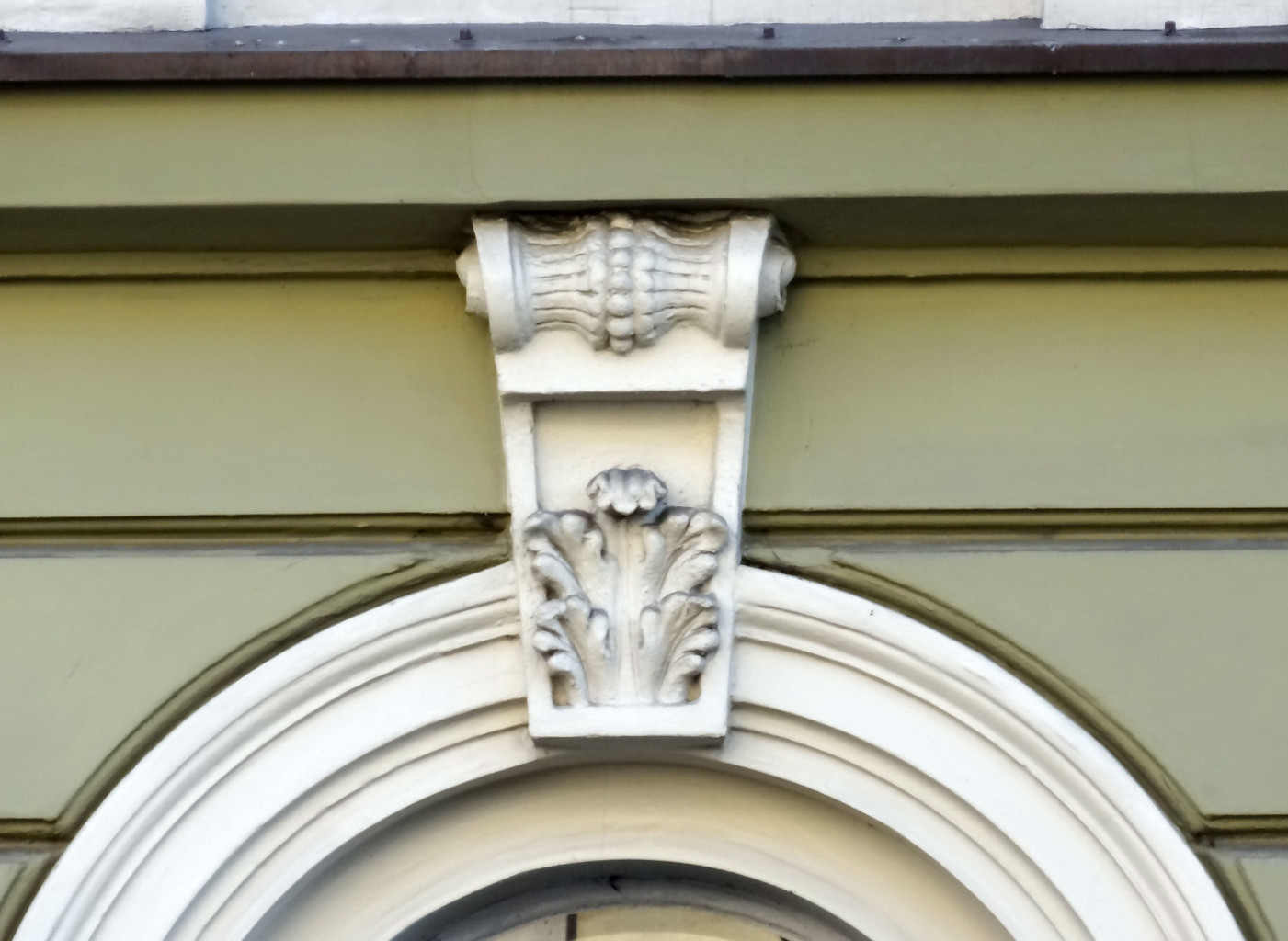
Architectural detail

== See also ==
- Bydgoszcz
- Piastowski Square, Bydgoszcz
- Bolesława Chrobrego Street
- Marian Rejewski
- Bydgoszcz Architects (1850–1970s)

== Bibliography ==
- Umiński, Janusz (1996). Bydgoszcz. Przewodnik [Bydgoszcz. Guide] (in Polish). Bydgoszcz: Regionalny Oddział PTTK "Szlak Brdy".
