= Adjusted current yield =

The adjusted current yield is a financial term used in reference to bonds and other fixed-interest securities. It is closely related to the concept of current yield.

The adjusted current yield is given by the current yield with addition of $\frac{ (\text{Face value}- \text{Clean price})/ \text{Years to maturity} }{\text{Clean price}}\cdot 100\%.$

Here Face value is the face value of the bond, and Clean price is the clean price of the bond (i.e. present value of the bond with accrued interest subtracted).

== Formula for adjusted current yield ==
In total the adjusted current yield is given by $\frac{\text{Annual coupon payments}}{\text{Clean price}}\cdot 100\% + \frac{ (\text{Face value}- \text{Clean price})/ \text{Years to maturity} }{\text{Clean price}}\cdot 100\%.$
