= Current yield =

Ratio of interest to price for a bond

The current yield, interest yield, income yield, flat yield, market yield, mark to market yield or running yield is a financial term used in reference to bonds and other fixed-interest securities such as gilts. It is the ratio of the annual interest (coupon) payment and the bond's price:

$\text{Current yield} = \frac{\text{Annual interest payment} }{\text{Current price} }.$

== Example ==
The current yield of a bond with a face value (F) of $100 and a coupon rate (r) of 5.00% that is selling at $95.00 (clean; not including accrued interest) (P) is calculated as follows.

$\text{Current Yield} = \frac{F \times r}{P} = \frac{\$100 \times 5.00\%}{\$95.00} = \frac{\$5.00}{\$95.00} = 5.2631\%$

== Shortcomings of current yield ==
The current yield refers only to the yield of the bond at the current moment. It does not reflect the total return over the life of the bond, or the factors affecting total return, such as:

- the length of time over which the bond produces cash flows for the investor (the maturity date of the bond),
- interest earned on reinvested coupon payments, or reinvestment risk (the uncertainty about the rate at which future cash flows can be reinvested), and
- fluctuations in the market price of a bond prior to maturity.

== Relationship between yield to maturity and coupon rate ==
The concept of current yield is closely related to other bond concepts, including yield to maturity (YTM), and coupon yield. When a coupon-bearing bond sells at;

- a discount: YTM > current yield > coupon yield
- a premium: coupon yield > current yield > YTM
- par: YTM = current yield = coupon yield.

For zero-coupon bonds selling at a discount, the coupon yield and current yield are zero, and the YTM is positive.

== Use in bond analysis ==
Current yield is used as a quick measure of the annual income a bond generates relative to its market price. The U.S. Securities and Exchange Commission’s investor glossary defines current yield as the ratio of the interest payable on a bond to its current market price.

Because it considers only the coupon payment and the bond’s current price, current yield is simpler than yield to maturity, but it is also less comprehensive. The SEC explains that yield to maturity reflects how much an investor’s money will earn if the bond is held until maturity, whereas current yield does not account for price changes as the bond approaches maturity.

== See also ==
- Adjusted current yield
