= Brett Christophers =

British geographer

Academic background
- Education: University of Oxford, University of British Columbia, University of Auckland

Academic work
- Discipline: Economic geography, political economy
- Institutions: Uppsala University

Brett Christophers is an economic geographer who is professor at the Institute for Housing and Urban Research at Uppsala University. He has written extensively on the history of the modern financial sector, the financial management of real economic assets, and the effect on the environment from financial management of land and natural resources.

Christophers received a BA in social geography from the University of Oxford in 1993, an MA from the University of British Columbia in 1995, and a PhD from the University of Auckland in 2008.

== Books ==
- Positioning the Missionary: John Booth Good and the Confluence of Cultures in Nineteenth-Century British Columbia (University of British Columbia, 1998)
- Envisioning Media Power: On Capital and Geographies of Television (Lexington Books, 2009)
- Banking Across Boundaries: Placing Finance in Capitalism (2013)
- The New Enclosure: The Appropriation of Public Land in Neoliberal Britain (Verso, 2018)
- Rentier Capitalism: Who Owns the Economy, and Who Pays for It? (Verso, 2020)
- Our Lives in Their Portfolios: Why Asset Managers Own the World (2023)
- The Price Is Wrong: Why Capitalism Won’t Save the Planet (Verso, 2024)
