= Nominal yield =

The coupon rate (nominal rate, or nominal yield) of a fixed income security is the interest rate that the issuer agrees to pay to the security holder each year, expressed as a percentage of the security's principal amount or par value. The coupon rate is typically stated in the name of the bond, such as "US Treasury Bond 6.25%". Unlike current yield, it does not vary with the market price of the security.

Coupon rates are fixed for the life of the security, except in the case of floating-rate bonds.
