= 7-day SEC yield =

Investment metric for US mutual funds

The 7-day SEC Yield is a measure of performance in the interest rates of money market mutual funds offered by US mutual fund companies. It is also referred to as the 7-day Annualized Yield.

== Calculation ==
The calculation is performed as follows:

1. Take the net interest income earned by the fund over the last 7 days and subtract 7 days of management fees.
2. Divide that dollar amount by the average size of the fund's investments over the same 7 days.
3. Multiply by 365/7 to give the 7-day SEC yield.

To calculate approximately how much interest one might earn in a money fund account, take the 7-day SEC yield, multiply by the amount invested, divide by the number of days in the year, and then multiply by the number of days in question. This does not take compounding into effect.

The 7-day SEC yield is only an estimate of the fund's actual yield, and may not necessarily reflect the yield that an investor would receive if they held the fund for a longer period of time.

== Examples ==
The examples assume interest is withdrawn as it is earned and not allowed to compound.

- If one has $1000 invested for 30 days at a 7-day SEC yield of 5%, then:

(0.05 × $1000 ) / 365 ≈ $0.137 per day.

Multiply by 30 days to yield $4.11 in interest.

- If one has $1000 invested for 1 year at a 7-day SEC yield of 2%, then:

(0.02 × $1000 ) / 365 ≈ $0.05479 per day.

Multiply by 365 days to yield $20.00 in interest.
