= Duration gap =

Financial institutions duration gap

In finance and accounting, and particularly in asset and liability management (ALM), the duration gap measures how well matched are the timings of cash inflows (from assets) and cash outflows (from liabilities), and is then one of the primary asset–liability mismatches considered in the ALM process. The term is typically used by banks, pension funds, or other financial institutions to measure, and manage, their risk due to changes in the interest rate: by duration matching, that is creating a "zero duration gap", the firm becomes immunized against interest rate risk. See Financial risk management § Investment management.

== Measurement ==
Formally, the duration gap is the difference between the duration - i.e. the average maturity - of assets and liabilities held by a financial entity. A related approach is to see the "duration gap" as the difference in the price sensitivity of interest-yielding assets and the price sensitivity of liabilities (of the organization) to a change in market interest rates (yields).

Under either, a gap can be beneficial or harmful, depending on where interest rates are headed.

- When the duration of assets is larger than the duration of liabilities, the duration gap is positive. In this situation, if interest rates rise, assets will lose more value than liabilities, thus reducing the value of the firm's equity. If interest rates fall, assets will gain more value than liabilities, thus increasing the value of the firm's equity.
- Conversely, when the duration of assets is less than the duration of liabilities, the duration gap is negative. If interest rates rise, liabilities will lose more value than assets, thus increasing the value of the firm's equity. If interest rates decline, liabilities will gain more value than assets, thus decreasing the value of the firm's equity.

== Management ==
As outlined, a key objective of ALM is to measure and then manage the direction and extent of any asset-liability mismatch - i.e. a funding or "maturity gap" - so as to maintain adequate profitability. This exercise will have the joint objectives of balancing maturities, cash-flows and / or interest rates, for a particular time horizon. The management thus takes the form of:

- matching the maturities of loans and investments with the maturities of deposits, equity, and external credit; the techniques commonly employed are immunization and cashflow matching.
- managing the spread between interest rate sensitive assets and interest rate sensitive liabilities; see Corporate bond § Risk analysis and Yield spread § Yield spread analysis.

A formula sometimes applied is: $Duration \ gap = duration \ of \ earning \ assets \ - \ duration \ of \ paying \ liabilities \ \times \ \frac{paying \ liabilities}{earning \ assets}$

Implied here, is that even if the duration gap is zero, the firm is immunized only if the size of the liabilities equals the size of the assets. Thus as an example, with a two-year loan of one million and a one-year asset of two millions, the firm is still exposed to rollover risk after one year when the remaining year of the two-year loan has to be financed.

$0 = 1 - 2 \times \frac{1,000,000}{2,000,000}$

Further limitations of the duration gap approach to risk-management include the following:

- the difficulty in finding assets and liabilities of the same duration
- some assets and liabilities may have patterns of cash flows that are not well defined
- customer prepayments may distort the expected cash flows in duration
- customer defaults may distort the expected cash flows in duration
- convexity, the extent to which duration is non-linear, can cause problems in estimation.

== Scope ==
The outlined "static" approach considers any future gaps due to current, i.e. existing, exposures, and any related exercise of (embedded) options - usually prepayments - at different points in time. "Dynamic gap analysis" enlarges the scope by including "what if" scenarios, testing potential changes in business activity (new volumes, additional prepayment transactions, potential hedging transactions), and considering unusual interest rate scenarios, with their associated shape of the yield curve and resultant changes in pricing. Depending on deal-stage and likelihood, analysts will incorporate expected capital investments and their required funding under either approach, as appropriate.

== See also ==
- Bond convexity
- Bond duration
- Cashflow matching
- Debt sculpting
- Embedded option
- Financial risk management § Investment management
- Laddering
- Liability-driven investment strategy
- Fixed income analysis
- Immunization (finance)
- Maturity transformation
- Interest rate risk in the banking book
