= Dedicated portfolio theory =

Investment strategy matching asset cashflows to future liabilities

Dedicated portfolio theory, in finance, deals with the characteristics and features of a portfolio built to generate a predictable stream of future cash inflows. This is achieved by purchasing bonds and/or other fixed income securities (such as certificates of deposit) that can and usually are held to maturity to generate this predictable stream from the coupon interest and/or the repayment of the face value of each bond when it matures. The goal is for the stream of cash inflows to exactly match the timing (and dollars) of a predictable stream of cash outflows due to future liabilities. For this reason it is sometimes called cash matching, or liability-driven investing. Determining the least expensive collection of bonds in the right quantities with the right maturities to match the cash flows is an analytical challenge that requires some degree of mathematical sophistication. College level textbooks typically cover the idea of “dedicated portfolios” or “dedicated bond portfolios” in their chapters devoted to the uses of fixed income securities.

== History ==
The most prolific author on dedicated portfolio theory, Martin L. Leibowitz, was the first to refer to dedicated portfolios as “cash matching” portfolios. He demonstrated how they are the simplest case of the technique known as bond portfolio immunization. In his sketch of its history, he traces the origin of immunization to Frederick R. Macaulay who first suggested the notion of “duration” for fixed income securities in 1938. Duration represents the average life of the coupon payments and redemption of a bond and links changes in interest rates to the volatility of a bond's value. One year later, J.R. Hicks independently developed a similar formulation referred to as the “average period.” In 1942, T.C. Koopmans pointed out in a report that, by matching the duration of the bonds held in a portfolio to the duration of liabilities those bonds would fund, the effects of interest rate changes could be mitigated or nullified completely, i.e. immunized. In 1945, Paul Samuelson formulated essentially the same concept, calling it the “weighted-average time period.” None of these earliest researchers cited each other's work, suggesting each developed the concept independently. The work culminated in a 1952 paper by a British actuary, F. M. Redington.

This body of work was largely ignored until 1971, when Lawrence Fisher and Roman Weil re-introduced immunization to the academic community in a journal article that followed a 1969 report written for the Center for Research in Security Prices. In 1972, I.T. Vanderhoof presented the concept to the American actuarial community. Academic papers on immunization, duration, and dedication began to appear in increasing numbers, as interest rates began to rise. As rates rose further and further above their long term averages, the financial investment industry began to pay attention, and their inquiries increasingly attracted the attention of academic researchers. Realizing that the high rates would allow them to lock in unprecedented rates of return, defined-benefit pension fund managers embraced the concepts. Goldman Sachs and other high level firms began to produce software to help bond portfolio managers apply the theory to their institutional sized portfolios. Most of the examples used in the literature typically utilized portfolios consisting of several hundred million dollars. In 1981, Leibowitz and Weinberger published a report on “contingent immunization” discussing the blending of active management of bond portfolios with immunization to provide a floor on returns. Leibowitz also published a paper in two parts defining dedicated portfolios in 1986. One of the side benefits of the theoretical work and practical interest was the development of new fixed income instruments, such as zero-coupon bonds.

== Example of a dedicated portfolio ==
While most of the original work on dedicated portfolios was done for large institutional investors such as pension funds, the most recent applications have been in personal investing. This example is a couple who wants to retire this year (call it 20XY, such as 2018) and has already set aside cash to cover their expenses. Social security will supply some income, but the rest will have to come from their portfolio. They have accumulated a retirement portfolio worth $2,000,000 in addition to this year's expenses. Typically, retirement portfolios have a higher percentage of bonds in their portfolio than portfolios owned by younger people who are not yet approaching retirement. Probably the most common retirement portfolio would be a 60/40 stock/bond allocation compared to an 80/20 or 90/10 stock/bond allocation for younger investors. Following a common rule of thumb for retirement withdrawal rates to make a retirement portfolio last at least 30 years, they should withdraw no more than 5 percent from their portfolio next year ($100,000). They can increase it each year by the amount of the previous year's inflation. To be conservative, they will plan for an annual inflation rate of 3 percent (they may not spend it, but want the protection just in case). Table 1, (Note: The 10-year Treasury rose above its long term average in 1968, more than one standard deviation above in 1975, and more than two standard deviations above in 1980, and more than three standard deviations in 1981.) lists the projected stream of withdrawals. These withdrawals represent the yearly “income” the couple needs for living expenses over their first eight years of retirement. Note that the total cash flow needed over the entire eight years sums to $889,234.

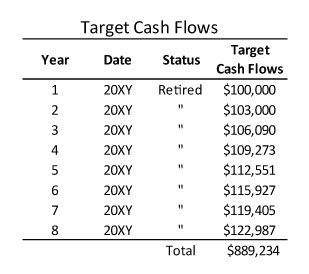
Table 1

Table 2 shows series of bonds and CDs with staggered maturities (called an "income matching bond ladder") whose coupon and principal payments will match the stream of income shown in the Target Cash Flows column in Table 1 (rates are fictitious for this example). The cash flow generated by the portfolio for the first year would be $100,380. This consists of the principal of the bond maturing on February 15 next year plus the coupon interest payments flowing from all the other bonds. The same would be true for the following year and every year thereafter. The total cash flows generated over the eight years sum to $889,350, compared to the target cash flow sum of $889,234, a difference of only $116. As with the first year, the cash flows are very close to the target cash flows needed for each year. The match cannot be perfect because bonds must usually be purchased in denominations of $1,000 (municipal bonds in denominations of $5,000). However, with the use of fairly sophisticated mathematical optimization techniques, correlations of 99 percent or better can usually be obtained. These techniques also determine which bonds to buy so as to minimize the cost of meeting the cash flows, which in this example is $747,325. Note that in this example, the bonds all mature on February 15, the middle of the first quarter. Other dates may be used, of course, such as the anniversary date of the portfolio's implementation.

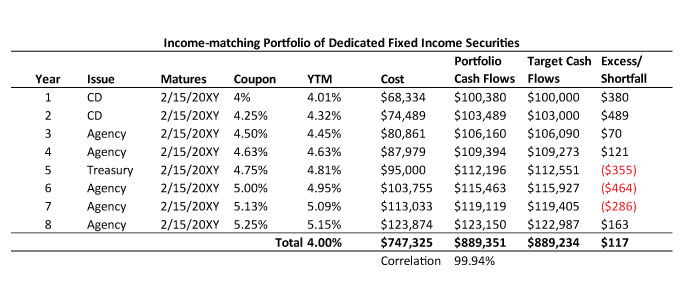
Table 2

This would be the initial dedicated portfolio for the couple. But they hopefully have a lifetime financial plan designed to last 30 or 40 years. Over time, that means the portfolio will need to be updated or rolled forward as each year passes to maintain the same 8-year time horizon. The time horizon could be extended by adding another bond with an 8-year maturity or the equivalent. Extending on a regular basis could therefore provide a perpetual series of 8-year horizons of protected income over the investor's entire lifetime and become the equivalent of a self-annuity. Whether the replenishment occurs every year automatically or only if other criteria are met would depend on the level of sophistication of the investor or advisor.

The 8 years of bonds can be thought of an “income portfolio” because it is dedicated to providing a predictable steam of income for the next 8 years. The rest of the portfolio can be thought of as a “growth portfolio” because it would be dedicated to providing the growth needed to replenish the income portfolio. The growth portfolio would presumably be invested in equities to achieve sufficient growth.

Recent research has sought to assess investment strategies designed from dedicated portfolio theory. Huxley, Burns, and Fletcher explored the tradeoffs in developing suitable growth portfolio strategies. Pfau compared the performance of dedicated portfolios against other common investment strategies for retirement. In all comparisons, the dedicated portfolio approach provided superior results.

Note that the fixed income securities shown in the example are high quality, safe “investment grade” fixed income securities, CDs and government-sponsored agency bonds, all chosen to avoid the risk of default. United States Treasury bonds could also be used. But they have lower yields, meaning a portfolio of Treasuries to meet the same flows would cost more than CDs and agencies. Triple-A rated corporate bonds are another option and usually have higher yields, but are theoretically riskier than government-sponsored bonds. Also, triple-A rated corporate bonds have become scarce since the 2008 financial crisis over the wide range of maturities needed for dedicated portfolios. Investors willing to take greater risks may use any quality of bond deemed acceptable in light of their higher yields, though safety would likely be of paramount importance for retirement.

Recall that a secondary goal of dedicated portfolio theory is to select the bonds that will provide the requisite cash flows at the lowest possible cost, given requirements on the minimum quality of bonds to be considered (thus the need for calculation). In this fictitious example, the cost shown is $747,325 to purchase this initial set of bonds, excluding transaction costs and fees, but the actual cost would vary depending on yields, quality of bonds used, and length of the time horizon. It would also depend on the starting time for the cash flows. If this couple planned to retire in five years, they could defer the starting time to coincide with their retirement date. They would buy a dedicated portfolio whose first bond matured in five years, the second in six years, etc. Yields would likely be higher on these bonds because they are further out on the yield curve.

Note that any of the bonds could be zero coupon bonds, meaning they do not pay any coupon interest. It would be easy to build a dedicated portfolio consisting entirely of zero coupon bonds, but their yields can often be lower than coupon bonds. Another problem with “zeros” is that taxes must be paid each year on the increase in value of a zero-coupon bond (assuming it is held in a taxable account), even though no interest was actually received.

Returning to our example, assume that this “income portfolio” were actually purchased, and the balance of the funds were invested in a “growth portfolio” of equity mutual funds or similar types of faster growing investments. The initial asset allocation would become 37% bonds, 63% stocks (see Table 3).

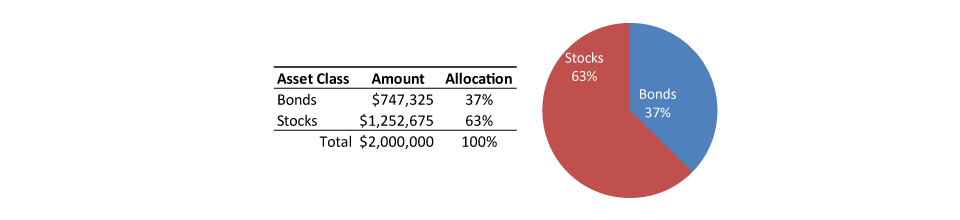
Table 3

== Advantages ==
1. Predictable cash flows. Because the dates and amounts of the coupon and redemption payments are known in advance, individual bonds held to maturity offer something few other financial investments can provide: predictability. Most bond funds cannot provide this certainty because they hold large volumes of many different bonds and typically trade them rather than holding them to maturity. Thus, they behave more like sluggish stock funds in terms of volatility.

2. Avoidance or reduction of investment risks. A number of risks associated with owning bonds are avoided or mitigated by using a dedicated portfolio:

a. Market risk (or capital risk) is avoided because the bonds are held to maturity. The market price at which the bond could be sold at any point in time may rise or fall before it reaches maturity, but these fluctuations are irrelevant to the investor if the bonds are held until they are paid off at face value. Of course, an investor does have the flexibility to sell off the bonds at any time in case an emergency arises.

b. Reinvestment risk is avoided because the interest and principal from the bonds are spent to fund the liabilities (such as the living expenses for the retiree) rather than being reinvested.

c. Inflation risk is mitigated by building an anticipated inflation adjustment into the target cash flows – recall the 3 percent annual adjustment used in the example. If inflation averages more than 3 percent, then the investor’s real income will fall; that is, it will not be sufficient to provide the same standard of living. This inflation risk can be avoided entirely if inflation indexed bonds such as TIPS are used to build the dedicated portfolio. These bonds pay coupon interest plus increase the principal by the rate of inflation from the previous year, then pay coupon interest on the inflated amount the next year. At redemption, they pay the full face value, plus the accumulated inflation.

d. Default risk (or credit risk) is mitigated by using only high quality investment grade bonds similar to those shown in the example above. Investors who are willing to assume more risk can build dedicated portfolios with lower quality bonds, gambling that a sufficient number of them will pay off ultimately.

e. Liquidity risk is mitigated because individual bonds can be sold if the need arises. This is a significant advantage compared to annuities, which are not tradable securities.

3. Specificity. Because dedicated portfolios are designed to provide a specific stream of funds to match future target cash flows, those cash flows must be quite specific in terms of timing and amounts. This need for specificity forces anyone contemplating a dedicated portfolio investment strategy to put careful thought into developing a formal, lifetime financial plan, as opposed to merely relying on vague or hazy goals and hoping for the best. The resulting asset allocation is based explicitly on the plan, instead of a generic model portfolio. This, of course, is the essence of serious financial planning, and the result is a portfolio that is tailored to the specific needs of each investor.

4. Asset Allocation. One of the shortcomings of Modern Portfolio Theory is that it provides only a general notion of how assets should be allocated among the major asset classes (stocks, bonds, and cash). It focuses on the tradeoff between return and volatility – that is, higher returns can be earned only by investments that fluctuate more rapidly and with greater intensity. Dedicated portfolio theory focuses explicitly on cash flows and time horizons. If done properly, it allocates to fixed income no more than the minimum funds necessary to generate the desired cash flows, and all other funds can be invested elsewhere, as demonstrated in the example above. Most investors find this to be a more intuitive explanation for why their assets are allocated the way they are.

5. Passive Management. There are two primary modes of thought on portfolio management. Advocates of active management believe that better returns are achieved by trying to time the market and selecting hot stocks (in other words, trying to predict the future). Advocates of passive management believe that better returns are achieved by buying broad based mutual funds, such as index funds, and holding them. Most academic research suggests that passive management has, in fact, historically produced higher returns over the long run. Dedicated portfolios fall into the category of passive management because once bonds are purchased, they are held to maturity. If all remaining funds are invested in an index fund, then the entire portfolio could be regarded as 100 percent passive. (Index fund providers, such as Dimensional Fund Advisors and Vanguard can supply voluminous research results on the active/passive management debate.)

== Disadvantages ==
Dedicated portfolios are not without disadvantages:

1. The primary disadvantage of dedicated portfolios is that they are not easy to construct. They require expertise in bonds and other fixed income securities. Not all bonds are suitable for dedicated portfolios. For instance, they cannot use callable bonds because a called bond will create an unpredicted cash inflow that will require reintegration with the stream of undisturbed cash flows.
2. They require a high level of expertise in the mathematics of optimization theory. To determine the right quantities for each maturity to match the cash flows at minimum cost requires a technique known as mathematical programming.
3. They require formal financial planning and specificity to develop the target cash flows for each year and determine an appropriate time horizon, which, in turn, require time, thought, and effort on the part of both the investor and the financial advisor.

== See also ==
- Cashflow matching
- Debt sculpting
- Duration gap
- Financial risk management § Investment management
- Immunization (finance)
- Laddering
- Liability-driven investment strategy
