= Asset–liability mismatch =

Mismatch between the timing or sensitivity of a firm's assets and liabilities

In finance, an asset–liability mismatch occurs when the financial terms of an institution's assets and liabilities do not correspond. Several types of mismatches are possible. An asset-liability mismatch presents a material risk at institutions with significant debt exposure, such as banks or sovereign governments. A significant mismatch may lead to insolvency or illiquidity, which can cause financial failure. Such risks were among the principal causes of economic crises such as the 1980s Latin American Debt Crisis, the 2007 Subprime Mortgage Crisis, the U.S. Savings and Loan Crisis, and the collapse of Silicon Valley Bank in 2023.

== Currency mismatch ==
For example, a bank that borrows funds in U.S. dollars and lends in Russian rubles would have a significant currency mismatch: if the value of the ruble were to fall relative to the dollar, then the bank would incur a financial loss. In extreme cases, such changes in the value of the assets and liabilities could lead to bankruptcy, liquidity crises, or balance-of-payment crises.

According to Anne O. Krueger of the IMF, the combination of fixed exchange rates and unsustainable debt burdens can amplify the impact of currency mismatch risk. Krueger proposes sound economic policies of reducing public debt and managing capital flows as ways of mitigating these crises.

According to research from Bank of International Settlements, the risk presented by aggregate currency matches (at the national level) may be mitigated by stronger foreign exchange positions by the government sector. Higher forex reserves and less foreign currency-denominated debt are two measures of capital strength which may be useful in this regard.

== Duration mismatch ==
A bank could also have substantial long-term assets (such as fixed-rate mortgages) funded by short-term liabilities, such as deposits. If the liabilities become due before the assets, then the bank may be unable to satisfy its obligations. As a result, it may be forced to liquidate some of its assets (perhaps at a loss) or raise additional capital (which may be dilutive or otherwise costly).

As pointed out by research from the University of Chicago, the liquidity mismatch caused between loans and deposits may be addressed by deposit insurance, such as that provided by the FDIC.

Duration mismatch is an indication of a firm with liquidity problems, and it may be measured using the quick ratio, acid test, or similar accounting metrics. This is sometimes called a maturity mismatch or liquidity mismatch, which can be measured by the duration gap.

Researchers analyzed the impact of liquidity mismatches in the years surrounding the 2007 Subprime mortgage crisis. They found that firms with more significant liquidity mismatch risk tended to:

- experience more negative stock returns during the crisis, but more positive returns in non-crisis periods
- experience more negative stock returns during liquidity runs, but more positive returns during government liquidity injections
- borrow more heavily from the government during the crisis

== Interest rate mismatch ==
An interest rate mismatch occurs when a bank borrows at one interest rate but lends at another. For example, a bank might borrow money by issuing floating interest rate bonds, but lend money with fixed-rate mortgages. If interest rates rise, the bank must increase the interest it pays to its bondholders, even though the interest it earns on its mortgages has not increased. This discrepancy can produce negative cash flows, which are financially unsustainable over the long term.

Interest rate mismatch was identified as the primary cause of the U.S. Saving and Loan Crisis in the 1980s. While interest rates rose as part of restrictive monetary policy, financial regulations had set limits on interest rates that could be offered in depository accounts. As a result, clients withdrew funds from depository institutions, creating immense financial pressure when combined with declining real estate prices.

== Other notes ==
Mismatches are handled by asset liability management. Solutions broadly include risk reduction, mitigation, or hedging.

Duration and currency mismatches were pointed out as key causes of the 1997 Asian Financial Crisis.

Asset–liability mismatches are important to insurance companies and various pension plans, which may have long-term liabilities (promises to pay the insured or pension plan participants) that must be backed by assets. Choosing assets that are appropriately matched to their financial obligations is therefore an important part of their long-term strategy.

Few companies or financial institutions have perfect matches between their assets and liabilities. In particular, the mismatch between the maturities of banks' deposits and loans makes banks susceptible to bank runs. On the other hand, a 'controlled' mismatch, such as between short-term deposits and somewhat longer-term, higher-interest loans to customers is central to many financial institutions' business model.

== See also ==
- Cashflow matching
- Debt sculpting
- Dedicated portfolio theory
- Diamond–Dybvig model
- Domestic liability dollarization
- Duration gap
- Interest rate risk in the banking book
- Immunization (finance)
- Laddering
- Liability-driven investment strategy
- Maturity transformation
- Original sin (economics)

== Sources ==
- Bodie, Zvi (2006). "On Asset-Liability Matching and Federal Deposit and Pension Insurance" (PDF). Federal Reserve Bank of St. Louis Review. 88 (4): 323–29.
- Definition of asset-liability mismatch
