= Fixed income analysis =

Process of valuing debt securities by assessing their risk and return

Fixed income analysis is the process of determining the value of a debt security based on an assessment of its risk profile, which can include interest rate risk, risk of the issuer failing to repay the debt, market supply and demand for the security, call provisions and macroeconomic considerations affecting its value in the future. Based on such an analysis, a fixed income analyst tries to reach a conclusion as to whether to buy, sell, hold, hedge or avoid the particular security.

Fixed income products are generally bonds: debt instruments requiring the issuer (i.e. the debtor or borrower) to repay the lender the amount borrowed (principal) plus interest over a specified period of time (coupon payments) until maturity. They are issued by government treasuries, government agencies, companies or international organizations.

== Calculating value ==
To determine the value of a fixed income security, the analyst must estimate the expected cash flows from the investment and the appropriate required yield. The cash flows consist of:

- periodic interest (known as coupon) payments prior to the maturity date, and
- the repayment of the principal at par value upon maturity.

The required yield is determined by investigating the yield offered on securities of comparable risk in the market. The required yield is applied to the expected cash flows to estimate their present value, which equals the security's value.

== Analysis ==
Key factors considered in fixed income analysis include the following:

- What is the appropriate yield premium for the security being analyzed compared to a U.S. Treasury security of the same maturity, and how does that compare to the yield premium reflected in the actual market price? Is the premium built into the yield enough to compensate for the risks? The factors that affect the yield premium include:
1. the type of issuer,
2. the issuer's perceived creditworthiness,
3. the potential impact of any embedded options, such as a call feature, which permit either the bondholder or the issuer to alter the cash flows,
4. the relationship between the market yield on bonds of the same credit quality but different maturities (known as the term structure of interest rates, or yield curve)
5. the taxability of the interest received by investors, and
6. the expected liquidity of the security. Demand comes from banks, insurance companies, pension funds, mutual funds, endowment organisations, external government treasuries, and individual investors such as retirees who need predictable cash flows from their investments.
- What are the new or hidden risks the market has overlooked and to what extent?
- Is inflation expected to worsen or improve?
- Does the real interest rate built into the yield make sense? Is the real interest rate in line with the expected GDP growth rate (in case of treasury bonds) or earnings growth rate (in case of corporate bonds)?
- Where do we stand in the business cycle of the particular company, or economic cycle of the particular country?
- Is there any change expected in the basic real interest rate in the near future? Will the prevailing monetary and economic conditions force any monetary easing or tightening?
- Are the financial authorities in the country pro-active or re-active to the forces of inflation and economic conditions?

The approaches for analysing fixed income products include the fundamental approach, the technical approach, and the relative value approach.

== See also ==
- Bond convexity
- Bond duration
- Bond option
- Callable bond
- Credit risk
- CS01
- Discount rate
- DV01
- Financial risk management § Investment management
- Floating interest rate
- Hedging
- Interest
- Interest rate risk
- Mortgage loan
- Preferred stock
- Prepayment risk
- Principal component analysis § Quantitative finance
- Rational pricing § Fixed-income securities
- Swaps
- Yield curve
- Andrew Kalotay
- Overbond
- Securities analysts:
  - Financial analyst § Securities firms
  - Securities research § Analyst specialization
