= Age of maturity =

Age of maturity may refer to:

== Human age ==
- Coming of age, a very young person's transition from childhood to adulthood
- Age of majority, the threshold of adulthood as it is conceptualized (and recognized or declared) in law
- Puberty, the process of physical changes by which a child's body matures into an adult body capable of sexual reproduction

== Other topics ==
- Maturity (finance), the final payment date of a loan or other financial instrument
- Sexual maturity, the age or stage when an organism can reproduce
