= EPEC =

EPEC may refer to:

- Eastern Passage Education Centre
- European PPP Expertise Centre
- Enteropathogenic Escherichia coli
