= Jim Puplava =

American financial analyst and businessman

- Born: 1950 (age 75–76); Gary, Indiana, United States
- Education: Arizona State University, American Graduate School of International Management
- Occupations: Stock broker, investment adviser, financial planner, podcaster, author.
- Employer: Financial Sense Wealth Management
- Website: www.financialsense.com

James Joseph (Jim) Puplava (born 1950) is an American investment analyst, financial planner and financial podcast host born in Gary, Indiana. He is the founder and president of Financial Sense Wealth Management. He is also chief author and host for the Financial Sense Newshour. His companies manage $800 million for mainly high net worth individuals.

== Early life and education ==
Puplava was raised in Arizona by Czechoslovak immigrant parents. He grew up in a family of 10 children.

Puplava graduated cum laude in History and Economics from Arizona State University. He then went on to graduate summa cum laude with a Master's Degree in Finance and Accounting from the American Graduate School of International Management (Thunderbird).

Puplava is a Certified Financial Planner, Certified Tax Specialist, Certified Income Specialist, Certified Estate and Trust Specialist, Certified Fund Specialist, Certified Annuity Specialist, Accredited Investment Fiduciary, Certified Social Security Specialist, Financial Planning & Wealth Management Professional, Series 7, Series 24, and Series 65 with the Financial Industry Regulatory Authority (FINRA); and Life, Disability and Variable Insurance licenses. Puplava has been president of Financial Sense Wealth Management since 1985. For twelve years, he held a position as Branch Manager for LPL Financial Services, LLC. In 1996, he incorporated the broker/dealer firm, Financial Sense® Securities, Inc. (PSI) and is its president.

He has worked as a financial writer to various publications and acted as a TV business editor. In 1988, Puplava began hosting Financial Sense Talk radio on various radio stations in San Diego. He oversees the portfolio management team at Financial Sense Wealth Management and Financial Sense® Securities. He also hosts weekly podcasts and writes commentary at FinancialSense.com.

== Career ==
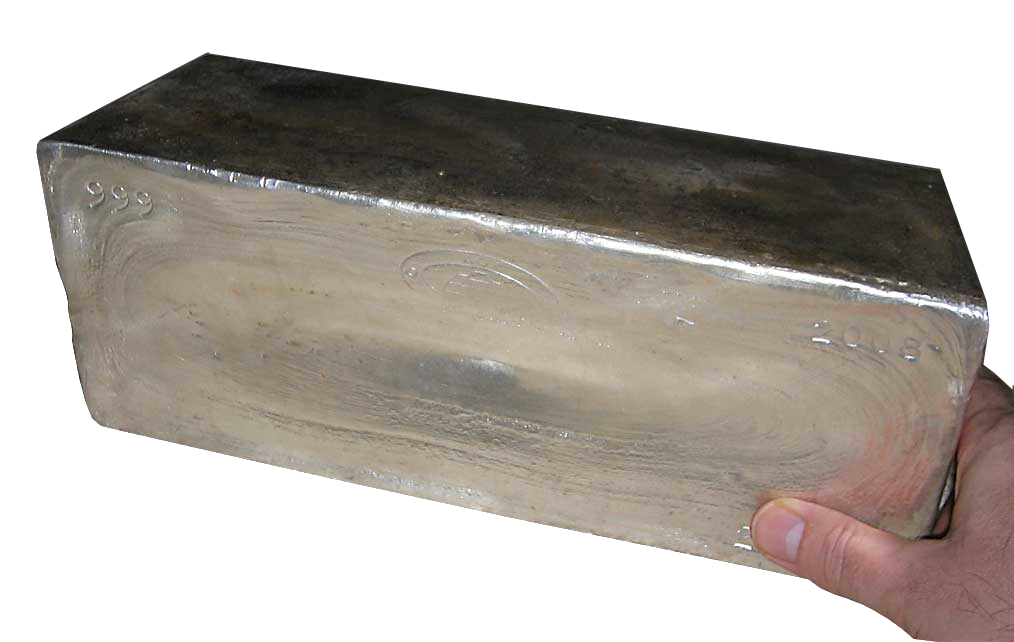
Silver 1000oz bar, recommended by Puplava as an inflation hedge

Jim Puplava provides financial education and commentary through his website, Financial Sense, and the Financial Sense Newshour podcast. He follows the views of the Austrian School of economics and has expressed concerns about inflationary outcomes resulting from recent fiscal and monetary policies. Financial Sense Newshour features interviews with guests representing a range of economic viewpoints. Puplava has advocated for investment in dividend-paying stocks and began highlighting inflation risks in early 2020, citing monetary and fiscal stimulus measures and supply-chain disruptions as key factors. He has also discussed the potential negative effects of financial repression on bond prices, advocating the use of laddered bond portfolios over bond funds. Puplava views precious metals such as gold and silver as a hedge against longer-term inflationary pressures and potential instability in fiat money systems. The Financial Sense platform covers a variety of topics, including economic trends, market analysis, book discussions, emerging technologies, and issues related to health and longevity.

=== Peak "cheap" oil ===
Puplava is an expert on the theory of peak oil and its consequences for the financial landscape, and was a speaker at the ASPO conference in 2008. He has interviewed several peak oil proponents on his radio program, including Richard Heinberg, Matt Simmons, Jim Kunstler, Robert L. Hirsch and Oxford University's Oliver Inderwildi. Following the development of horizontal drilling and hydraulic fracturing (“fracking”) techniques and the subsequent growth in U.S. shale oil production since 2010, Puplava revised his views on peak oil. He now emphasizes that while new technologies have increased supply, the most easily accessible and lowest-cost global oil reserves have largely been discovered and depleted.

=== TV roles and appearances ===
In 1991, Puplava was hired to anchor the nightly segment Business Today for KUSI TV. He appeared on ABC News's Nightline program on November 8, 2007, in a segment called "Sign of the Times" with John Donovan.

=== Financial Sense Wealth Management ===
Financial Sense Wealth Management (formerly Puplava Financial Services) is an American investment and financial planning firm founded in 1985. Initially established as a small financial planning service, the company has expanded into a team of portfolio managers and client service managers, and includes a broker-dealer arm that provides services to other advisors and representatives. Financial Sense Wealth Management primarily serves high net worth individuals and businesses, with financial planning and money management as core components of its business.

=== Kimber Resources proxy battle ===
Kimber Resources is a Canadian-based company listed on the Toronto Stock Exchange and the American Stock Exchange and is engaged in the development and exploration of mineral properties in Mexico, of which the most advanced project is the Monterde gold/silver property. Puplava was elected to Kimber's Board of Directors in May 2004. In September 2006, a press release issued by Kimber Resources reported a disagreement. Puplava, by then a director and significant shareholder, stated his intention to start a proxy battle with the objective of replacing a majority of the Board of Directors and current management. Late October 2006, Puplava agreed to withdraw his threat for a proxy battle when the board of directors agreed to changes in the management team.

== Personal life ==
Puplava and his wife Mary, who also acted as his office manager and webmaster from 1990 to 2018, live in Poway, near San Diego, California, near their three sons. Puplava is a history buff, an avid reader and loves sailing. Puplava has also appeared as a guest speaker for Koinonia House conferences.

== Achievements ==
- 2020 — Ranked by the Financial Times as one of the top 300 Registered Investment Advisors in the US.
- 2009 — Selected by Goldline Research, as published in Forbes, as one of the leading wealth managers of Southern California for 2009.
- 2008 — Received a "Five Star Wealth Manager" award after being nominated as one of the San Diego area's best wealth managers, as based on nine criteria: customer service, integrity, knowledge/expertise, communication, value for fee charged, meeting of financial objectives, post-sale service, quality of recommendations and overall satisfaction. (As published in the February 2008 issue of San Diego Magazine.)
- 1992 — Puplava was honored as one of America's top ten financial representatives by Registered Representative magazine.
