= Project finance =

Long-term financing strategy

Project finance is the long-term financing of infrastructure and industrial projects based upon the projected cash flows of the project rather than the balance sheets of its sponsors. Usually, a project financing structure involves a number of equity investors, known as 'sponsors', and a 'syndicate' of banks or other lending institutions that provide loans to the operation. They are most commonly non-recourse loans, which are secured by the project assets and paid entirely from project cash flow, rather than from the general assets or creditworthiness of the project sponsors, a decision in part supported by financial modeling; see Project finance model. The financing is typically secured by all of the project assets, including the revenue-producing contracts. Project lenders are given a lien on all of these assets and are able to assume control of a project if the project company has difficulties complying with the loan terms.

Generally, a special purpose entity is created for each project, thereby shielding other assets owned by a project sponsor from the detrimental effects of a project failure. As a special purpose entity, the project company has no assets other than the project. Capital contribution commitments by the owners of the project company are sometimes necessary to ensure that the project is financially sound or to assure the lenders of the sponsors' commitment. Project finance is often more complicated than alternative financing methods. Traditionally, project financing has been most commonly used in the extractive (mining), transportation, telecommunications, and power industries, as well as for sports and entertainment venues.

Risk identification and allocation is a key component of project finance. A project may be subject to a number of technical, environmental, economic and political risks, particularly in developing countries and emerging markets. Financial institutions and project sponsors may conclude that the risks inherent in project development and operation are unacceptable (unfinanceable). "Several long-term contracts such as construction, supply, off-take and concession agreements, along with a variety of joint-ownership structures are used to align incentives and deter opportunistic behaviour by any party involved in the project." The patterns of implementation are sometimes referred to as "project delivery methods." The financing of these projects must be distributed among multiple parties, so as to distribute the risk associated with the project while simultaneously ensuring profits for each party involved. In designing such risk-allocation mechanisms, it is more difficult to address the risks of developing countries' infrastructure markets as their markets involve higher risks.

A riskier or more expensive project may require limited recourse financing secured by a surety from sponsors. A complex project finance structure may incorporate corporate finance, securitization, real options, insurance provisions or other types of collateral enhancement to mitigate unallocated risk.

== Origin ==
Limited recourse lending was used to finance maritime voyages in ancient Greece and Rome. Its use in infrastructure projects dates back to the development of the Panama Canal and was widespread in the U.S. oil and gas industry during the early 20th century. However, project finance for high-risk infrastructure schemes originated with the development of the North Sea oil fields in the 1970s and 1980s. Such projects were previously undertaken through utility or government bond issuances, or other traditional corporate finance structures.

Project financing in the developing world peaked around the time of the Asian financial crisis, but the subsequent downturn in industrializing countries was offset by growth in the OECD countries, causing worldwide project financing to peak around 2000. The need for project financing remains high worldwide, as more countries require increasing supplies of public utilities and infrastructure. In recent years, project finance schemes have become increasingly common in the Middle East, some incorporating Islamic finance.

The new project finance structures emerged primarily in response to the opportunity presented by long-term power purchase contracts available from utilities and government entities. These long-term revenue streams were required by rules implementing PURPA. The policy resulted in further deregulation of electric generation and, significantly, international privatization following amendments to the Public Utilities Holding Company Act in 1994. The structure has evolved and now forms the basis for energy and other projects throughout the world.

== Parties to a project financing ==
There are several parties in a project financing depending on the type and the scale of a project. The most usual parties to a project financing are:

1. Sponsor (typically also an Equity Investor)
2. Lenders (including senior lenders and/or mezzanine)
3. Off-taker(s)
4. Contractor and equipment supplier (traditionally EPCs)
5. Operator
6. Financial Advisors
7. Technical Advisors
8. Legal Advisors
9. Market Advisors
10. Environmental Consultants
11. Equity Investors
12. Regulatory Agencies
13. Multilateral Agencies / Export Credit Agencies
14. Insurance Providers
15. Hedge providers

== Project development ==
Project development is the process of preparing a new project for commercial operations. The process can be divided into three distinct phases:

- Pre-bid stage
- Contract negotiation stage
- Money-raising stage

== Financial model ==
A financial model is constructed by the sponsor as a tool to conduct negotiations with the investor and prepare a project appraisal report. It is usually a spreadsheet designed to process a comprehensive list of input assumptions, and to provide outputs that reflect the anticipated "real life" interaction between data and calculated values for a particular project. Properly designed, the financial model is capable of sensitivity analysis, i.e. calculating new outputs based on a range of data variations.

== Contractual framework ==
The typical project finance documentation can be reconducted to six main types:

- Shareholder/sponsor documents
- Project documents
- Finance documents
- Security documents
- Other project documents
- Director/promotor Contribution

=== Engineering, procurement and construction (EPC) contract ===
The most common project finance construction contract is the engineering, procurement and construction (EPC) contract. An EPC contract generally provides for the obligation of the contractor to build and deliver the project facilities on a fixed price, turnkey basis, i.e., at a certain pre-determined fixed price, by a certain date, in accordance with certain specifications, and with certain performance warranties. The EPC contract is quite complicated in terms of legal issue, therefore the project company and the EPC contractor need sufficient experience and knowledge of the nature of project to avoid their faults and minimize the risks during contract execution.

The terms EPC contract and turnkey contract are interchangeable. EPC stands for engineering (design), procurement and construction. Turnkey is based on the idea that when the owner takes responsibility for the facility all it will need to do is turn the key and the facility will function as intended. Alternative forms of construction contract are a project management approach and alliance contracting. Basic contents of an EPC contract are:

- Description of the project
- Price
- Payment (typically by milestones)
- Completion date
- Completion guarantee and Liquidated Damages (LDs):
- Performance guarantee and LDs
- Cap under LDs

=== Operation and maintenance agreement ===
An operation and maintenance (O&M) agreement is an agreement between the project company and the operator. The project company delegates the operation, maintenance and often performance management of the project to a reputable operator with expertise in the industry under the terms of the O&M agreement. The operator could be one of the sponsors of the project company or third-party operator. In other cases the project company may carry out by itself the operation and maintenance of the project and may eventually arrange for the technical assistance of an experienced company under a technical assistance agreement. Basic contents of an O&M contract are:

- Definition of the service
- Operator responsibility
- Provision regarding the services rendered
- Liquidated damages
- Fee provisions

=== Concession deed ===
An agreement between the project company and a public-sector entity (the contracting authority) is called a concession deed. The concession agreement concedes the use of a government asset (such as a plot of land or river crossing) to the project company for a specified period. A concession deed would be found in most projects which involve government such as in infrastructure projects. The concession agreement may be signed by a national/regional government, a municipality, or a special purpose entity set up by the state to grant the concession. Examples of concession agreements include contracts for the following:

- A toll-road or tunnel for which the concession agreement giving a right to collect tolls/fares from the public or where payments are made by the contracting authority based on usage by the public.
- A transportation system (e.g., a railway / metro) for which the public pays fares to a private company)
- Utility projects where payments are made by a municipality or by end-users.
- Ports and airports where payments are usually made by airlines or shipping companies.
- Other public sector projects such as schools, hospitals, government buildings, where payments are made by the contracting authority.

=== Shareholders' agreement ===
The shareholders' agreement (SHA) is an agreement between the project sponsors to form a special purpose company (SPC) in relation to the project development. This is the most basic of structures held by the sponsors in a project finance transaction. This is an agreement between the sponsors and deals with:

- Injection of share capital
- Voting requirements
- Resolution of force one
- Dividend policy
- Management of the SPC
- Disposal and pre-emption rights

=== Off-take agreement ===
An off-take agreement is an agreement between the project company and the offtaker (the party who is buying the product / service that the project produces / delivers). In a project financing the revenue is often contracted (rather than being sold on a merchant basis). The off-take agreement governs mechanism of price and volume which make up revenue. The intention of this agreement is to provide the project company with stable and sufficient revenue to pay its project debt obligation, cover the operating costs and provide certain required return to the sponsors. The off-taker assumes the risk of marketing or finding a profitable use for the product, and so may also make an extra profit if the market price exceeds expectations. An offtake is a kind of futures contract.

The main off-take agreements are:

- Take-or-pay contract: under this contract the off-taker – on an agreed price basis – is obligated to pay for product on a regular basis whether or not the off-taker actually takes the product.
- Power purchase agreement: commonly used in power projects in emerging markets. The purchasing entity is usually a government entity.
- Take-and-pay contract: the off-taker only pays for the product taken on an agreed price basis.
- Long-term sales contract: the off-taker agrees to take agreed-upon quantities of the product from the project. The price is however paid based on market prices at the time of purchase or an agreed market index, subject to certain floor (minimum) price. Commonly used in mining, oil and gas, and petrochemical projects where the project company wants to ensure that its product can easily be sold in international markets, but off-takers not willing to take the price risk
- Hedging contract: found in the commodity markets such as in an oilfield project.
- Contract for Differences: the project company sells its product into the market and not to the off-taker or hedging counterpart. If however the market price is below an agreed level, the offtaker pays the difference to the project company, and vice versa if it is above an agreed level.
- Throughput contract: a user of the pipeline agrees to use it to carry not less than a certain volume of product and to pay a minimum price for this.

=== Supply agreement ===
A supply agreement is between the project company and the supplier of the required feedstock / fuel.

If a project company has an off-take contract, the supply contract is usually structured to match the general terms of the off-take contract such as the length of the contract, force majeure provisions, etc. The volume of input supplies required by the project company is usually linked to the project’s output. Example under a PPA the power purchaser who does not require power can ask the project to shut down the power plant and continue to pay the capacity payment – in such case the project company needs to ensure its obligations to buy fuel can be reduced in parallel. The degree of commitment by the supplier can vary.

The main supply agreements are:

1. Fixed or variable supply: the supplier agrees to provide a fixed quantity of supplies to the project company on an agreed schedule, or a variable supply between an agreed maximum and minimum. The supply may be under a take-or-pay or take-and-pay.

2.Output / reserve dedication: the supplier dedicates the entire output from a specific source, e.g., a coal mine, its own plant. However, the supplier may have no obligation to produce any output unless agreed otherwise. The supply can also be under a take-or-pay or take-and-pay

3.Interruptible supply: some supplies such as gas are offered on a lower-cost interruptible basis – often via a pipeline also supplying other users.

4.Tolling contract: the supplier has no commitment to supply at all, and may choose not to do so if the supplies can be used more profitably elsewhere. However, the availability charge must be paid to the project company.

=== Loan agreement ===
A loan agreement is made between the project company (borrower) and the lenders. Loan agreement governs relationship between the lenders and the borrowers. It determines the basis on which the loan can be drawn and repaid, and contains the usual provisions found in a corporate loan agreement. It also contains the additional clauses to cover specific requirements of the project and project documents.

Basic terms of a loan agreement include the following provisions.

- General conditions precedent
- Conditions precedent to each drawdown
- Availability period, during which the borrower is obliged to pay a commitment fee
- Drawdown mechanics
- An interest clause, charged at a margin over base rate
- A repayment clause
- Financial covenants - calculation of key project metrics / ratios and covenants
- Dividend restrictions
- Representations and warranties
- The illegality clause

=== Intercreditor agreement ===
Intercreditor agreement is agreed between the main creditors of the project company. This is the agreement between the main creditors in connection with the project financing. The main creditors often enter into the Intercreditor Agreement to govern the common terms and relationships among the lenders in respect of the borrower’s obligations.

Intercreditor agreement will specify provisions including the following.

- Common terms
- Order of drawdown
- Cashflow waterfall
- Limitation on ability of creditors to vary their rights
- Voting rights
- Notification of defaults
- Order of applying the proceeds of debt recovery
- If there is a mezzanine funding component, the terms of subordination and other principles to apply as between the senior debt providers and the mezzanine debt providers.

=== Tripartite deed ===
The financiers will usually require that a direct relationship between itself and the counterparty to that contract be established which is achieved through the use of a tripartite deed (sometimes called a consent deed, direct agreement or side agreement). The tripartite deed sets out the circumstances in which the financiers may “step in” under the project contracts in order to remedy any default.

A tripartite deed would normally contain the following provision.

- Acknowledgement of security: confirmation by the contractor or relevant party that it consents to the financier taking security over the relevant project contracts.
- Notice of default: obligation on the relevant project counterparty to notify the lenders directly of defaults by the project company under the relevant contract.
- Step-in rights and extended periods: to ensure that the lenders will have sufficient notice /period to enable it to remedy any breach by the borrower.
- Receivership: acknowledgement by the relevant party regarding the appointment of a receiver by the lenders under the relevant contract and that the receiver may continue the borrower’s performance under the contract
- Sale of asset: terms and conditions upon which the lenders may transfer the borrower’s entitlements under the relevant contract.

Tripartite deed can give rise to difficult issues for negotiation but is a critical document in project financing.

=== Common Terms Agreement ===
An agreement between the financing parties and the project company which sets out the terms that are common to all the financing instruments and the relationship between them (including definitions, conditions, order of drawdowns, project accounts, voting powers for waivers and amendments). A common terms agreement greatly clarifies and simplifies the multi-sourcing of finance for a project and ensures that the parties have a common understanding of key definitions and critical events.

=== Terms Sheet ===
Agreement between the borrower and the lender for the cost, provision and repayment of debt. The term sheet outlines the key terms and conditions of the financing. The term sheet provides the basis for the lead arrangers to complete the credit approval to underwrite the debt, usually by signing the agreed term sheet. Generally the final term sheet is attached to the mandate letter and is used by the lead arrangers to syndicate the debt. The commitment by the lenders is usually subject to further detailed due diligence and negotiation of project agreements and finance documents including the security documents. The next phase in the financing is the negotiation of finance documents and the term sheet will eventually be replaced by the definitive finance documents when the project reaches financial close.

== Basic scheme ==
Hypothetical project finance scheme

For example, the Acme Coal Co. imports coal. Energen Inc. supplies energy to consumers. The two companies agree to build a power plant to accomplish their respective goals. Typically, the first step would be to sign a memorandum of understanding to set out the intentions of the two parties. This would be followed by an agreement to form a joint venture.

Acme Coal and Energen form an SPC (Special Purpose Corporation) called Power Holdings Inc. and divide the shares between them according to their contributions. Acme Coal, being more established, contributes more capital and takes 70% of the shares. Energen is a smaller company and takes the remaining 30%. The new company has no assets.

Power Holdings then signs a construction contract with Acme Construction to build a power plant. Acme Construction is an affiliate of Acme Coal and the only company with the know-how to construct a power plant in accordance with Acme's delivery specification.

A power plant can cost hundreds of millions of dollars. To pay Acme Construction, Power Holdings receives financing from a development bank and a commercial bank. These banks provide a guarantee to Acme Construction's financier that the company can pay for the completion of construction. Payment for construction is generally paid as such: 10% up front, 10% midway through construction, 10% shortly before completion, and 70% upon transfer of title to Power Holdings, which becomes the owner of the power plant.

Acme Coal and Energen form Power Manage Inc., another SPC, to manage the facility. The ultimate purpose of the two SPCs (Power Holding and Power Manage) is primarily to protect Acme Coal and Energen. If a disaster happens at the plant, prospective plaintiffs cannot sue Acme Coal or Energen and target their assets because neither company owns or operates the plant. However project financiers may recognize this and require some sort of parent guarantee for up to negotiated amounts of operational liabilities.

A Sale and Purchase Agreement (SPA) between Power Manage and Acme Coal supplies raw materials to the power plant. Electricity is then delivered to Energen using a wholesale delivery contract. The net cash flow of the SPC Power Holdings (sales proceeds less costs) will be used to repay the financiers.

== Complicating factors ==
The above is a simple explanation which does not cover the mining, shipping, and delivery contracts involved in importing the coal (which in itself could be more complex than the financing scheme), nor the contracts for delivering the power to consumers. In developing countries, it is not unusual for one or more government entities to be the primary consumers of the project, undertaking the "last mile distribution" to the consuming population. The relevant purchase agreements between the government agencies and the project may contain clauses guaranteeing a minimum offtake and thereby guarantee a certain level of revenues. In other sectors including road transportation, the government may toll the roads and collect the revenues, while providing a guaranteed annual sum (along with clearly specified upside and downside conditions) to the project. This serves to minimise or eliminate the risks associated with traffic demand for the project investors and the lenders.

Minority owners of a project may wish to use "off-balance-sheet" financing, in which they disclose their participation in the project as an investment, and excludes the debt from financial statements by disclosing it as a footnote related to the investment. In the United States, this eligibility is determined by the Financial Accounting Standards Board. Many projects in developing countries must also be covered with war risk insurance, which covers acts of hostile attack, derelict mines and torpedoes, and civil unrest which are not generally included in "standard" insurance policies. Today, some altered policies that include terrorism are called Terrorism Insurance or Political Risk Insurance. In many cases, an outside insurer will issue a performance bond to guarantee timely completion of the project by the contractor.

Publicly funded projects may also use additional financing methods such as tax increment financing or private finance initiative (PFI). Such projects are often governed by a capital improvement plan which adds certain auditing capabilities and restrictions to the process.

Project financing in transitional and emerging market countries are particularly risky because of cross-border issues such as political, currency and legal system risks. Therefore, mostly requires active facilitation by the government.

== See also ==
- Lead arranger
- European PPP Expertise Centre (EPEC)
- Power purchase agreement
