= Interest sensitivity gap =

The interest sensitivity gap was one of the first techniques used in asset liability management to manage interest rate risk. The use of this technique was initiated in the middle 1970s in the United States when rising interest rates in 1975-1976 and again from 1979 onward triggered a banking crisis that later resulted in more than $1 trillion in losses when the Federal Deposit Insurance Corporation and the Federal Savings and Loan Insurance Corporation were forced to liquidate hundreds of failed institutions who had typically lent for long maturities at fixed interest rates (such as 30 year fixed rate mortgages) and borrowed for much shorter maturities. The interest rate sensitivity gap classifies all assets, liabilities and off balance sheet transactions by effective maturity from an interest rate reset perspective. A 30-year fixed rate mortgage would be classified as a 30-year instrument. A 15-year mortgage with a rate fixed only for the first year would be classified as a one-year instrument. The interest rate sensitivity gap compares the amount of assets and liabilities in each time period in the interest rate sensitivity gap table. This comparison gives an approximate view of the interest rate risk of the balance sheet being analyzed. The interest rate sensitivity gap is much less accurate than modern interest rate risk management technology where the impact of a change in the yield curve can be analyzed using the Heath-Jarrow-Morton framework based on the work of researchers such as John Hull, Alan White, Robert C. Merton, Robert A. Jarrow and many others.
