= Texas hedge =

Risk-increasing strategy that amplifies an existing position

A Texas hedge in business and finance, is a financial hedge that increases exposure to risk. An example would be hedging the purchase of a call option by buying shares of the same underlying or hedging UK Non-conforming RMBS Residuals with Mezzanine tranches.

== Origin ==
"Texas Hedging" dates back to the early days of the CBOE and CME, when options were gaining in popularity.

Notoriously aggressive traders were known to push markets their way when buying cheap near-term options. The earliest known reference comes from James Gilbert, a former TransMarket Group floor clerk, who relayed the following to Trader Magazine in 2006: "I was a runner at the time. And I see this guy signal to buy 500 futures. Big futures. And I know he just bought calls. So I yell - hey, you are backwards on your hedge! And he looks me square in the face with these eyes of cobalt, not an ounce of joviality in his veins. He says 'Boy - I'm from Texas. We don't hedge when we're right in Texas. We double-down, son.' The whole pit must've heard him, because from that moment on, any time any trader mistakenly hedged backwards, they would say 'I TEXASED' and the whole trading crowd would point and laugh. Everybody but Bill, from Texas. He would just stare, with those piercing cobalt eyes."

In livestock trading, the Texas hedge typically refers derisively to Texan cattle ranchers who might buy cattle futures contracts while already owning cattle, thereby doubling their risk exposure.

== See also ==
- List of finance topics
