= Reinvestment risk =

Form of financial risk primarily associated with fixed income securities

Reinvestment risk is a form of financial risk. It is primarily associated with fixed income securities (including bonds), in the form of early redemption risk and coupon reinvestment risk.

== Early redemption ==
One form of reinvestment risk is the possibility that the cash flows from an investment might somehow be cancelled or stopped before its stated maturity date. This could happen if the issuer has the right to redeem (or "call") a fixed income security before its contractual maturity date. In that case, the investor might not be able to find a new investment which is as attractive as the security being redeemed.

Mortgage loans typically include a prepayment option, which permits the borrower to repay a portion or all of the loan before scheduled maturity. This creates reinvestment risk for lenders and mortgage-backed securities holders. Early termination of the loan can also occur when the borrower sells the property, refinances the loan or defaults. In each case, the lender and the holder of a mortgage-backed security cannot be certain of receiving the expected cash flows from the loan. Prepayment models have been developed to help deal with this risk.

== Coupon reinvestment ==
Investors who plan to reinvest periodic interest (or "coupon") payments face uncertainty because the returns (interest rates) at which those cash flows will be reinvested cannot be known at the time of the initial purchase.

If market rates of interest decrease after the initial investment is made, reinvestment risk works against the security holder, since future interest payments to the investor will be reinvested at a lower return than expected when the bond was purchased. As finance scholar Dr. Annette Thau has observed, the use of the term "risk" in this case is not quite correct because there is no actual risk of loss, either of principal or interest. "But... if you reinvest coupons at a lower rate than the [yield to maturity] quoted to you [when the bond was bought], actual return will then be lower than the yield to maturity quoted to you when you bought the bond."

When interest rates rise, reinvestment risk works in the security holder's favor because cash flows received can be reinvested in higher-yielding securities.

Reinvestment risk and interest rate risk have offsetting effects: higher market rates decrease the market value of the bond, but increase the interest earned on reinvested coupons. A bond portfolio strategy known as immunization takes advantage of these offsetting effects.

As Thau and finance scholar Dr. Frank Fabozzi have observed, securities with a longer term to maturity carry greater reinvestment risk. The same is true of bonds with high coupon rates.

Zero-coupon bonds, which are issued by the U.S. Department of the Treasury, have no coupon reinvestment risk because they have no periodic coupon payments, interest being paid in full when the bond matures.

Reinvestment risk is particularly important for mortgage-backed securities, because payments are received as frequently as every month. Bonds purchased at a premium are more susceptible to reinvestment risk than discount bonds.

For investors who plan to spend, rather than invest, a security's cash flows, reinvestment risk may not be an issue.

== Pension funds ==
Pension funds are subject to reinvestment risk, especially with the short-term nature of cash investments. There is always the risk that future proceeds will have to be reinvested at a lower interest rate.

== See also ==
- Financial risk
- Liquidity risk
