= Synthetic replication =

Derivatives on ETF funds

Synthetic replication was first introduced in Europe in 2001. Synthetic replication is done through a type of exchange traded fund (ETF). An important attribute of this specific type of fund is that it does not hold any underlying securities featured on its benchmark. Instead of holding these securities synthetic ETF’s use derivatives such as swaps to track the underlying index in the process of replication. In replication of these synthetic accounts the return is 100% tied to the ETF it represents. Therefore, the ETF “replicates” the fund's it is tied to performance. In this process the ETF manager enters a swap contract with an investment bank that agrees to pay the index return in exchange for a small fee.

== Benefits and Drawbacks ==
The biggest argued benefit of synthetic ETFS is that they seem to do a more accurate job of tracking indices, and when used in full replication can allow for less risk/higher return investments. Those who argue against synthetic replication say that it adds counterparty risk, is not fully transparent, and could mislead less experienced investors.

== Example ==
For instance Black–Scholes theory claims vanilla option pricing can be achieved through the use of stock and zero-coupon bond. A simple example would be if you went to a bank and purchased a synthetic ETF for the purpose of replication. That fund may represent a certain group of stocks in Apple. However, the synthetic ETF is in no way physically attached to Apples stock. The bank you purchased the fund from would largely mirror Apples stock performance 100% through the use of derivatives and swaps in the process of replication and would charge you a fee for it. This is an extremely simple example but does describe the base process of synthetic replication.

== List of Synthetic Exchange Traded Funds (ETFs) ==
- Amundi ETF MSCI EMU High Dividend UCITS ETF EUR (C)
- Amundi ETF MSCI Europe Banks UCITS ETF EUR (C)
- Amundi ETF MSCI Europe Energy UCITS ETF EUR (C)
- Amundi ETF MSCI Europe Healthcare UCITS ETF EUR (C)
- Amundi ETF MSCI Europe ex EMU UCITS ETF EUR (C)
- Amundi ETF MSCI France UCITS ETF
- Amundi ETF MSCI Spain UCITS ETF EUR (C)
- Amundi ETF MSCI UK UCITS ETF EUR (C)
- Amundi ETF MSCI World ex EMU UCITS ETF EUR (C)
- Amundi ETF STOXX Europe 50 UCITS ETF EUR (C)
- Amundi MSCI Emerging Markets UCITS ETF EUR (C)
- BNP Paribas Easy S&P GSCI Energy & Metals Capped Component UCITS ETF A USD
- Comstage Australia (S&P/ASX 200) UCITS ETF - Dist
- Comstage Bloomberg Equal-weight Commodity ex-Agriculture UCITS ETF
- Comstage China Enterprise (HSCEI) UCITS ETF - Acc
- Comstage Commodities Refinitiv/CoreCommodity CRB TR UCITS ETF - Acc
- Comstage Commodities Refinitiv/CoreCommodity CRB EX-Energy TR UCITS ETF - Acc
- Comstage DJ Global Titans 50 UCITS ETF - Dist
- Comstage Dow Jones Industrial Average UCITS ETF - Dist
- Comstage Euro Overnight Return UCITS ETF - Acc
- Comstage FTSE 100 UCITS ETF - Acc
- Comstage iBoxx GBP Liquid Corporates Long Dated UCITS ETF - Dist
- Comstage iBoxx USD Liquid Emerging Markets Sovereigns UCITS ETF - Dist
- Comstage MSCI AC Asia Pacific Ex Japan UCITS ETF - Acc
- Comstage MSCI All Country World UCITS ETF - Acc (USD)
- Comstage MSCI Brazil UCITS ETF - Acc
- Comstage MSCI Eastern Europe ex Russia UCITS ETF - Acc
- Comstage MSCI Emerging Markets (LUX) UCITS ETF
- Comstage MSCI Emerging Markets UCITS ETF - Acc EUR
- Comstage MSCI Emerging Markets UCITS ETF - Acc USD
- Comstage MSCI EM Latin America UCITS ETF - Acc
- Comstage MSCI India UCITS ETF - Acc (USD)
- Comstage MSCI Korea UCITS ETF - Acc
- Comstage MSCI Russia UCITS ETF - Dist
- Comstage MSCI Taiwan UCITS ETF - Acc
- Comstage MSCI Turkey UCITS ETF - Acc
- Comstage MSCI USA UCITS ETF - Dist
- Comstage MSCI World Consumer Discretionary TR UCITS ETF - Acc (USD)
- Comstage MSCI World Consumer Staples TR UCITS ETF - Acc (USD)
- Comstage MSCI World Energy TR UCITS ETF - Acc (USD)
- Comstage MSCI World Financials TR UCITS ETF - Acc (USD)
- Comstage MSCI World Health Care TR UCITS ETF - Acc (USD)
- Comstage MSCI World Industrials TR UCITS ETF - Acc (USD)
- Comstage MSCI World Information Technology TR UCITS ETF - Acc (USD)
- Comstage MSCI World Materials TR UCITS ETF - Acc (USD)
- Comstage MSCI World Telecommunication Services TR UCITS ETF - Acc (USD)
- Comstage MSCI World Utilities TR UCITS ETF - Acc (USD)
- Comstage Nasdaq-100 UCITS ETF - Acc
- Comstage Russell 1000 Growth UCITS ETF - Acc
- Comstage SG Global Quality Income NTR UCITS ETF - Acc
- Comstage SG Global Quality Income NTR UCITS ETF - Dist
- Comstage S&P 500 UCITS ETF - Dist (USD)
- CS ETF (IE) on CSI 300
- CS ETF (IE) on EONIA
- CS ETF (IE) on Fed Funds Effective Rate
- CS ETF (IE) on MSCI EM EMEA
- CS ETF (IE) on MSCI India
- CS ETF (IE) on MSCI Taiwan
- Invesco Commodity Composite UCITS ETF Acc
- Invesco European Autos Sector UCITS ETF
- Invesco European Banks Sector UCITS ETF
- Invesco European Basic Resources Sector UCITS ETF
- Invesco European Chemicals Sector UCITS ETF
- Invesco European Construction Sector UCITS ETF
- Invesco European Financials Sector UCITS ETF
- Invesco European Food & Bev Sector UCITS ETF
- Invesco European Health Care Sector UCITS ETF
- Invesco European Household Sector UCITS ETF
- Invesco European Industrials Sector UCITS ETF Acc
- Invesco European Insurance Sector UCITS ETF Acc
- Invesco European Media Sector UCITS ETF
- Invesco European Oil & Gas Sector UCITS ETF
- Invesco European Retail Sector UCITS ETF
- Invesco European Technology Sector UCITS ETF
- Invesco European Telecoms Sector UCITS ETF
- Invesco European Travel Sector UCITS ETF
- Invesco European Utilities Sector UCITS ETF
- Invesco EURO STOXX 50 UCITS ETF
- Invesco EURO STOXX 50 UCITS ETF Dist
- Invesco EURO STOXX Optimised Banks UCITS ETF
- Invesco FTSE 100 UCITS ETF
- Invesco FTSE 250 UCITS ETF
- Invesco Morningstar US Energy Infrastructure MLP UCITS ETF Acc
- Invesco Morningstar US Energy Infrastructure MLP UCITS ETF Dist
- Invesco MSCI Emerging Markets UCITS ETF
- Invesco MSCI Europe UCITS ETF
- Invesco MSCI Europe Value UCITS ETF
- Invesco MSCI Japan UCITS ETF
- Invesco MSCI USA UCITS ETF
- Invesco MSCI World UCITS ETF
- Invesco Russell 2000 UCITS ETF
- Invesco RDX UCITS ETF
- Invesco S&P 500 UCITS ETF
- Invesco STOXX Europe 600 UCITS ETF
- Invesco STOXX Europe Mid 200 UCITS ETF
- Invesco STOXX Europe Small 200 UCITS ETF
- Invesco US Consumer Discretionary Sector UCITS ETF
- Invesco US Consumer Staples Sector UCITS ETF
- Invesco US Energy Sector UCITS ETF
- Invesco US Financials Sector UCITS ETF
- Invesco US Health Care Sector UCITS ETF
- Invesco US Industrials Sector UCITS ETF
- Invesco US Materials Sector UCITS ETF
- Invesco US Technology Sector UCITS ETF
- Invesco US Utilities Sector UCITS ETF
- iShares Diversified Commodity Swap UCITS ETF (DE)
- L&G DAX Daily 2x Long UCITS ETF
- L&G DAX Daily 2x Short UCITS ETF
- L&G FTSE 100 Leveraged (Daily 2x) UCITS ETF
- L&G FTSE 100 Super Short Strategy (Daily 2x) UCITS ETF
- L&G Longer Dated All Commodities UCITS ETF
- Lyxor BTP Daily (-2x) Inverse UCITS ETF - Acc
- Lyxor Bund Daily (-2x) Inverse UCITS ETF - Acc
- Lyxor Bund Future Daily (-1x) Inverse UCITS ETF
- Lyxor CAC 40 Daily (-1x) Inverse UCITS ETF - Acc
- Lyxor CAC 40 Daily (2x) Leveraged UCITS ETF - Acc
- Lyxor China Enterprise (HSCEI) UCITS ETF USD
- Lyxor Daily LevDAX UCITS ETF - Acc
- Lyxor Daily ShortDAX x2 UCITS ETF - Acc
- Lyxor EuroMTS Covered Bond Aggregate UCITS ETF - Dist
- Lyxor EURO STOXX 50 Daily (-1x) Inverse UCITS ETF - Acc
- Lyxor EURO STOXX 50 Daily (-2x) Inverse UCITS ETF - Acc
- Lyxor FTSE EPRA/NAREIT Global Developed UCITS ETF - Dist (EUR)
- Lyxor FTSE EPRA/NAREIT Global Developed UCITS ETF - Dist (USD)
- Lyxor FTSE MIB Daily (-2x) Inverse (Xbear) UCITS ETF - Acc
- Lyxor Hong Kong (HSI) UCITS ETF - Dist
- Lyxor IBEX 35 Doble Inverso Diario UCITS ETF - Acc
- Lyxor MSCI AC Asia Pacific Ex Japan UCITS ETF USD
- Lyxor MSCI AC Asia Ex Japan UCITS ETF - Acc
- Lyxor MSCI All Country World UCITS ETF - Acc (EUR)
- Lyxor MSCI Greece UCITS ETF - Dist
- Lyxor MSCI India UCITS ETF - Acc (EUR)
- Lyxor MSCI Indonesia UCITS ETF - Acc
- Lyxor MSCI Russia UCITS ETF - Acc
- Lyxor MSCI USA UCITS ETF - Acc
- Lyxor MSCI World UCITS ETF - Dist
- Lyxor MSCI World Communication Services TR UCITS ETF - Acc (EUR)
- Lyxor MSCI World Consumer Discretionary TR UCITS ETF - Acc (EUR)
- Lyxor MSCI World Consumer Staples TR UCITS ETF - Acc (EUR)
- Lyxor MSCI World Energy TR UCITS ETF - Acc (EUR)
- Lyxor MSCI World Financials TR UCITS ETF - Acc (EUR)
- Lyxor MSCI World Health Care TR UCITS ETF - Acc (EUR)
- Lyxor MSCI World Industrials TR UCITS ETF - Acc (EUR)
- Lyxor MSCI World Information Technology TR UCITS ETF - Acc (EUR)
- Lyxor MSCI World Materials TR UCITS ETF - Acc (EUR)
- Lyxor MSCI World Utilities TR UCITS ETF - Acc (EUR)
- Lyxor Pan Africa UCITS ETF - Acc
- Lyxor S&P 500 VIX Futures Enhanced Roll UCITS ETF - Acc
- Lyxor S&P 500 UCITS ETF - Dist (EUR)
- Lyxor S&P 500 UCITS ETF - Daily Hedged to EUR - Dist
- Lyxor STOXX Europe 600 Automobiles & Parts UCITS ETF - Acc
- Lyxor STOXX Europe 600 Banks UCITS ETF - Acc
- Lyxor STOXX Europe 600 Basic Resources UCITS ETF - Acc
- Lyxor STOXX Europe 600 Chemicals UCITS ETF - Acc
- Lyxor STOXX Europe 600 Construction & Materials UCITS ETF - Acc
- Lyxor STOXX Europe 600 Financial Services UCITS ETF - Acc
- Lyxor STOXX Europe 600 Food & Beverage UCITS ETF - Acc
- Lyxor STOXX Europe 600 Healthcare UCITS ETF - Acc
- Lyxor STOXX Europe 600 Industrial Goods & Services UCITS ETF - Acc
- Lyxor STOXX Europe 600 Insurance UCITS ETF - Acc
- Lyxor STOXX Europe 600 Media UCITS ETF - Acc
- Lyxor STOXX Europe 600 Oil & Gas UCITS ETF - Acc
- Lyxor STOXX Europe 600 Personal & Household Goods UCITS ETF - Acc
- Lyxor STOXX Europe 600 Real Estate UCITS ETF - Dist
- Lyxor STOXX Europe 600 Retail UCITS ETF - Acc
- Lyxor STOXX Europe 600 Technology UCITS ETF - Acc
- Lyxor STOXX Europe 600 Telecommunications UCITS ETF - Acc
- Lyxor STOXX Europe 600 Travel & Leisure UCITS ETF - Acc
- Lyxor STOXX Europe 600 Utilities UCITS ETF - Acc
- Lyxor STOXX Europe Select Dividend 30 UCITS ETF - Dist
- Market Access NYSE Arca Gold Bugs UCITS ETF
- Market Access Rogers International Commodity UCITS ETF
- Ossiam Emerging Markets Minimum Variance NR UCITS ETF 1C (USD)
- Ossiam Europe ESG Machine Learning UCITS ETF 1C (EUR)
- Ossiam Risk Weighted Enhanced Commodity Ex Grains TR UCITS ETF 1C (USD)
- Ossiam STOXX Europe 600 Equal Weight NR UCITS ETF 1C (EUR)
- UBS ETF (IE) Bloomberg Commodity Index SF UCITS ETF (CHF) A-acc
- UBS ETF (IE) Bloomberg Commodity Index SF UCITS ETF (EUR) A-acc
- UBS ETF (IE) Bloomberg Commodity Index SF UCITS ETF (GBP) A-acc
- UBS ETF (IE) Bloomberg Commodity Index SF UCITS ETF (USD) A-acc
- UBS ETF (IE) CMCI Composite SF UCITS ETF (hedged to CHF) A-acc
- UBS ETF (IE) CMCI Composite SF UCITS ETF (hedged to EUR) A-acc
- UBS ETF (IE) CMCI Composite SF UCITS ETF (USD) A-acc
- UBS ETF (IE) MSCI AC Asia Ex Japan SF UCITS ETF (USD) A-acc
- UBS ETF (IE) MSCI Emerging Markets SF UCITS ETF (USD) A-acc
- UBS ETF (IE) MSCI USA SF UCITS ETF (USD) A-acc
- UBS ETF (IE) S&P 500 SF UCITS ETF (USD) A-acc
- Xtrackers II EUR Overnight Rate Swap UCITS ETF 1C
- Xtrackers II EUR Overnight Rate Swap UCITS ETF 1D
- Xtrackers II Eurozone AAA Government Bond Swap UCITS ETF 1D
- Xtrackers CSI 300 Swap UCITS ETF 1C
- Xtrackers DB Bloomberg Commodity Optimum Yield Swap UCITS ETF 2C EUR hedged
- Xtrackers DBLCI Commodity Optimum Yield Swap UCITS ETF 1C EUR hedged
- Xtrackers DBLCI Commodity Optimum Yield Swap UCITS ETF 3C GBP hedged
- Xtrackers DBLCI Commodity Optimum Yield Swap UCITS ETF USD Hedged
- Xtrackers EUR Liquid Corporate 12.5 Swap UCITS ETF 1C
- Xtrackers EURO STOXX 50 Short Daily Swap UCITS ETF 1C
- Xtrackers Fed Funds Effective Rate Swap UCITS ETF 1C
- Xtrackers FTSE 100 Short Daily Swap UCITS ETF 1C
- Xtrackers FTSE Vietnam Swap UCITS ETF 1C
- Xtrackers iBoxx EUR Liquid Covered Swap UCITS ETF 1C
- Xtrackers iBoxx Germany Covered Swap UCITS ETF 1C
- Xtrackers iBoxx Germany Covered Swap UCITS ETF 1D
- Xtrackers iBoxx Sovereigns Eurozone AAA Swap UCITS ETF 1C
- Xtrackers iTraxx Crossover Short Daily Swap UCITS ETF 1C
- Xtrackers iTraxx Crossover Swap UCITS ETF 1C
- Xtrackers iTraxx Europe Swap UCITS ETF 1C
- Xtrackers LevDAX Daily Swap UCITS ETF 1C
- Xtrackers LPX MM Private Equity Swap UCITS ETF 1C
- Xtrackers MSCI AC Asia ex Japan Swap UCITS ETF 1C
- Xtrackers MSCI EFM Africa Top 50 Capped Swap UCITS ETF 1C
- Xtrackers MSCI Emerging Markets Swap UCITS ETF 1C
- Xtrackers MSCI EM Asia Swap UCITS ETF 1C
- Xtrackers MSCI EM EMEA Swap UCITS ETF 1C
- Xtrackers MSCI EM Latin America Swap UCITS ETF 1C
- Xtrackers MSCI India Swap UCITS ETF 1C
- Xtrackers MSCI Indonesia Swap UCITS ETF
- Xtrackers MSCI Indonesia Swap UCITS ETF 1C
- Xtrackers MSCI Pakistan Swap UCITS ETF 1C
- Xtrackers MSCI Russia Capped Swap UCITS ETF 1C
- Xtrackers MSCI Russia Capped Swap UCITS ETF 2D
- Xtrackers MSCI USA Swap UCITS ETF 1C
- Xtrackers MSCI World Swap UCITS ETF 1C
- Xtrackers MSCI World Swap UCITS ETF 2C
- Xtrackers MSCI World Swap UCITS ETF 4C EUR hedged
- Xtrackers MTS Ex-Bank of Italy BOT Swap UCITS ETF 1C
- Xtrackers Nifty 50 Swap UCITS ETF 1C
- Xtrackers ShortDAX Daily Swap UCITS ETF 1C
- Xtrackers ShortDAX x2 Daily Swap UCITS ETF 1C
- Xtrackers Short iBoxx EUR Sovereigns Eurozone Daily Swap UCITS ETF 1C
- Xtrackers S&P 500 2x Inverse Daily Swap UCITS ETF 1C
- Xtrackers S&P 500 2x Leveraged Daily Swap UCITS ETF 1C
- Xtrackers S&P 500 Inverse Daily Swap UCITS ETF 1C
- Xtrackers S&P 500 Swap UCITS ETF 1C
- Xtrackers S&P Global Infrastructure Swap UCITS ETF 1C
- Xtrackers S&P Select Frontier Swap UCITS ETF 1C
- Xtrackers Sterling Cash Swap UCITS ETF 1D
- Xtrackers STOXX Europe 600 Banks Swap UCITS ETF 1C
- Xtrackers STOXX Europe 600 Basic Resources Swap UCITS ETF 1C
- Xtrackers STOXX Europe 600 Food & Beverage Swap UCITS ETF 1C
- Xtrackers STOXX Europe 600 Health Care Swap UCITS ETF 1C
- Xtrackers STOXX Europe 600 Industrial Goods Swap UCITS ETF 1C
- Xtrackers STOXX Europe 600 Oil & Gas Swap UCITS ETF 1C
- Xtrackers STOXX Europe 600 Technology Swap UCITS ETF 1C
- Xtrackers STOXX Europe 600 Telecommunications Swap UCITS ETF 1C
- Xtrackers STOXX Europe 600 Utilities Swap UCITS ETF 1C
- Xtrackers STOXX Global Select Dividend 100 Swap UCITS ETF 1D
- Xtrackers USD Overnight Rate Swap UCITS ETF 1C
