= Martin L. Leibowitz =

American financial economist

- Born: Martin Louis Leibowitz; June 19, 1936; York, Pennsylvania
- Died: May 6, 2026 (aged 89); Mountain Lakes, N.J.
- Education: University of Chicago; New York University
- Occupation: Salomon Brothers TIAA Morgan Stanley
- Years active: 1969–2026
- Known for: "Inside the Yield Book"
- Spouse: Sarah Fryer (m. 1966)
- Children: 3 Kim L. Targoff; Becky T. Peterson; Karen L. Leibowitz

Martin L. Leibowitz was a financial researcher, business leader, and a managing director of Morgan Stanley. His most well-known work is Inside the Yield Book.

== Career ==
Before joining Morgan Stanley, Leibowitz was vice chairman and chief investment officer of TIAA-CREF from 1995 to 2004. Previously he had worked for 26 years for Salomon Brothers, rising to become its managing director in charge of research. He is also a member of the Board of Trustees of the Institute for Advanced Study. In April 2009 he was named adviser to the board of directors to Singapore's sovereign fund. In March 2012, he was appointed to The Rockefeller Foundation's board of trustees.

Leibowitz has authored several books and more than 150 articles, 10 of which have received the Financial Analysts Journal's Graham and Dodd Award of Excellence. His Inside the Yield Book (co-authored with Sidney Homer), first published in 1972 and reissued in 2004, is a work which, according to Frank Fabozzi, "transformed the markets’ understanding of bonds." He was instrumental in developing the dedicated portfolio theory in the 1980s.

Leibowitz is also the recipient of the following CFA Institute Awards: the Nicholas Molodovsky Award in 1995, the James R. Vertin Award in 1998, and the Award for Professional Excellence in 2005. In 1995, he was the first person inducted into the Fixed Income Analysts Society Hall of Fame.

Leibowitz holds both a bachelor's and master's degree from the University of Chicago and a Ph.D. in mathematics from the Courant Institute of New York University.

== Bibliography ==
- Inside the Yield Book, (with Sidney Homer), 1972
- Return Targets and Shortfall Risks: Studies in Strategic Asset Allocation, (with Stanley Kogelman and Lawrence N. Bader), 1995
- Franchise Value: A Modern Approach to Security Analysis, 2004
- Modern Portfolio Management: Active Long/Short 130/30 Equity Strategies, (with Simon Emrich and Anthony Bova), 2008
- The Endowment Model of Investing: Return, Risk, and Diversification, (with Anthony Bova and P. Brett Hammond), 2010
