= Overbond =

Canadian financial technology company

Overbond Ltd.
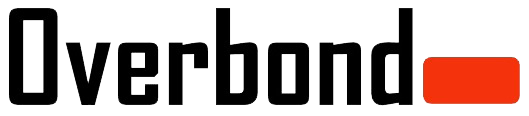
- Company type: Private
- Industry: Financial Analytics
- Founded: 2015; 11 years ago
- Founder: Vuk Magdelinic; Han Ryoo
- Headquarters: Toronto, Ontario, Canada
- Key people: Vuk Magdelinic (Chief executive officer); Behzad Nikzad (Chief of Data Science)
- Website: www.overbond.com

Overbond Ltd. is a Canadian financial technology company, specializing in fixed income analytics, and based in Toronto, Ontario.

== History ==
Overbond was founded in 2015 by Vuk Magdelinic and Han Ryoo, two fixed income experts.

In early 2016, it raised $7.5 million in seed financing from Morrison Financial, one of the largest seed financing rounds in Canadian history.

In January 2017, it launched a digital bond issuing service, called OverbondX. In November 2017, Overbond announced it would expand to the American market, opening an office in New York.

In 2023, Overbond launched their new artificial intelligence-based system. The system assists with both the buying and selling side of their online ordering system. The ordering system is an AI-based credit trading automation that can reach global customers within a fixed-income trading space.

== Business ==
Overbond's main product is a platform providing predictions for the pricing and timing of new corporate bond issues. The predictions are generated through the use of neural networks, based on credit ratings and secondary trading market data. Traditionally, bond origination is done manually through banks, who contact potential investors to gauge the demand for an offering, and take a significant fee for their services. The company claims that its platform provides more transparency, eliminates inefficiencies associated with the traditional approach and reduces fees for the issuer. It sells access to this platform on a subscription basis to corporate clients and institutional investors. In the Canadian market, Overbond has approximately 81 of 200 frequently issuing companies as clients, and approximately half of institutional investors. Clients include Burger King, Molson Coors Brewing, Alimentation Couche-Tard and BCE Inc. Overbond has a total of 200 clients in all.

As of early 2018, Overbond had approximately 40 employees.

== Controversies ==
In February of 2019, Overbond's CEO Vuk Magdelinic was accused of fraudulent reviews on the popular workplace review website Glassdoor. Several reviews point out the similarity between positive reviews, and many point to Magdelinic as author. Many cite high turnover at the firm, with management being the core issue.
