= Frank Redington =

British actuary (1906–1984)

Frank Mitchell Redington (10 May 1906 – 23 May 1984) was a noted British actuary. Frank Redington was best known for his development of Immunisation Theory which specifies how a fixed income portfolio can be "immunised" against changing interest rates.

Redington's work indirectly led to the development of Liability Driven Investment (LDI) techniques for corporate pension funds. Interest rate SWAPS and bond investment when combined with the use of inflation protection measures (e.g. Index Linked Gilts, SWAPS and similar derivative contracts), can help protect pension funds from funding volatility.

This was first adopted by a major pension fund in the UK in 1999/2000 when Boots the Chemists moved to virtually a 100% Government and corporate bond investment strategy, partly advised by its Corporate Finance Director, John Ralfe. This proved extremely well timed given the stock market crash of 2001 and up to a third of large pension schemes have subsequently adopted similar strategies, especially mature schemes that have closed to new members and future accruals. 'Marking to market' accounting standards that highlighted the risks being run by defined benefit (DB) pension schemes, together with more rigid regulation, solvency requirements, dividend tax, low interest rates and improving longevity, have all contributed to DB pension scheme decline in the private sector.

The antithesis to Redington's philosophy would be the 'cult of the equity' as championed by George Ross Goobey. Ross Goobey, as Imperial Tobacco's pension fund manager, first noticed that dividends from shares could rise over time and provide a real rate of return, albeit volatile and not certain. Long term investors could normally be expected to ride out the inevitable troughs and in the 1950s and 1960s most schemes adopted an equity strategy, alongside Gilts and bonds, as equities did deliver good (if variable) returns.

Frank Redington was born in Leeds and attended Liverpool Institute for Boys, and Cambridge University. He joined the staff of the Prudential life insurance company in 1928 and became its Chief Actuary in 1951, continuing in that capacity until his retirement in 1968.

He was the Chairman of the Life Offices’ Association from 1956–1957 and president of the Institute of Actuaries 1958–1960. In 2003, he was voted "the greatest British actuary ever" by readers of The Actuary, the magazine for the actuarial profession.

== Sources ==
- Chamberlin, Gary (ed.)(1986), A Ramble Through the Actuarial Countryside: The Collected Papers & Speeches of Frank Mitchell Redington, MA, Staple Inn, UK: Institute of Actuaries Students’ Society. ISBN 0-901066-12-5
