= European PPP Expertise Centre =

The European PPP Expertise Centre (EPEC) is part of the Advisory Services of the European Investment Bank (EIB). It is an initiative that also involves the European Commission, member states of the EU, candidate states and certain other states. EPEC helps strengthen the capacity of its public sector members to enter into public–private partnership (PPP) transactions.

== Key areas of activity ==
EPEC carries out three main types of activity:

Sharing good PPP practice through network activities:

- Providing market intelligence
- Addressing practical issues in implementing PPPs
- Developing PPP guidance and tools

Assisting PPP policy development:

- PPP legal and regulatory frameworks
- PPP institutional arrangements
- Processes for preparation, approving and managing PPPs

Supporting upstream PPP project preparation:

- Early-stage involvement
- Support tailored to individual projects
- High-level strategic advice (‘advising not doing’, ‘working with not for’)

== Members ==
Membership in EPEC is strictly limited to public authorities whose role includes policy responsibility and the promotion of PPP projects or programmes at national or regional level.

To date, EPEC has 41 Members, including the EIB and the European Commission. All other Members are national or regional authorities that are responsible for PPP policy or programmes in their jurisdictions. Membership is restricted to public authorities in European Union member states, Candidate Countries and certain other countries in Europe

== Statements on PPP risks ==
In spite of its overall goal, EPEC also states that "an excessive focus on off government balance sheet recording can be at the expense of sound project preparation and value for money and may push public authorities to use PPPs where not appropriate". In addition, it admits that PPPs can create an "affordability illusion" which "tends to be exacerbated when a project is found to be off balance sheet. The fiscal liabilities that arise from PPPs can have a detrimental effect on the relevant country’s fiscal sustainability and so they should be managed properly".
