= Bond convexity =

Financial measurement

In finance, bond convexity is a measure of the non-linear relationship of bond prices to changes in interest rates, and is defined as the second derivative of the price of the bond with respect to interest rates (duration is the first derivative). In general, the higher the duration, the more sensitive the bond price is to the change in interest rates. Bond convexity is one of the most basic and widely used forms of convexity in finance. Convexity was based on the work of Hon-Fei Lai and popularized by Stanley Diller.

== Calculation of convexity ==
Duration is a linear measure or 1st derivative of how the price of a bond changes in response to interest rate changes. As interest rates change, the price is not likely to change linearly, but instead it would change over some curved function of interest rates. The more curved the price function of the bond is, the more inaccurate duration is as a measure of the interest rate sensitivity.

Convexity is a measure of the curvature or 2nd derivative of how the price of a bond varies with interest rate, i.e. how the duration of a bond changes as the interest rate changes. Specifically, one assumes that the interest rate is constant across the life of the bond and that changes in interest rates occur evenly. Using these assumptions, duration can be formulated as the first derivative of the price function of the bond with respect to the interest rate in question. Then the convexity would be the second derivative of the price function with respect to the interest rate.

Convexity does not assume the relationship between Bond value and interest rates to be linear. In actual markets, the assumption of constant interest rates and even changes is not correct, and more complex models are needed to actually price bonds. However, these simplifying assumptions allow one to quickly and easily calculate factors which describe the sensitivity of the bond prices to interest rate changes.

== Why bond convexities may differ ==
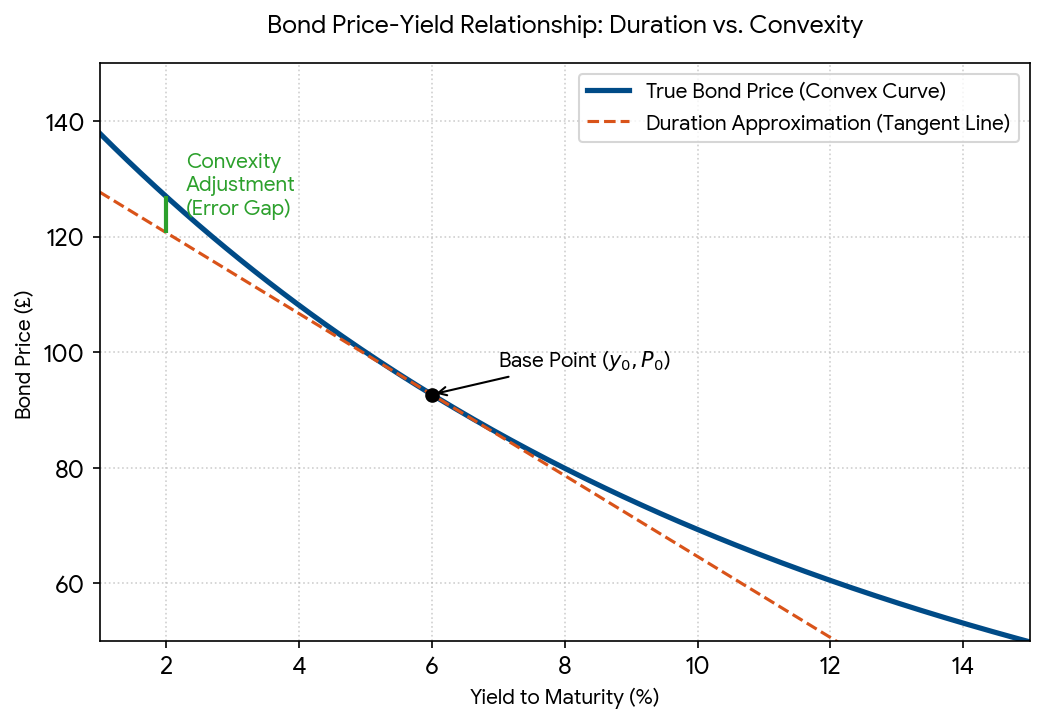
Bond price-yield curve showing the linear approximation of duration and the resulting convexity error gap

The price sensitivity to parallel changes in the term structure of interest rates is highest with a zero-coupon bond and lowest with an amortizing bond (where the payments are front-loaded). Although the amortizing bond and the zero-coupon bond have different sensitivities at the same maturity, if their final maturities differ so that they have identical bond durations then they will have identical sensitivities. That is, their prices will be affected equally by small, first-order, (and parallel) yield curve shifts. They will, however, start to change by different amounts with each further incremental parallel rate shift due to their differing payment dates and amounts.

For two bonds with the same par value, coupon, and maturity, convexity may differ depending on what point on the price yield curve they are located.

== Mathematical definition ==
If the flat, continuously compounded yield is $r$ and the bond price is $B(r)$, then convexity is defined as
$$C(r) = \frac{1}{B(r)}\,\frac{\mathrm{d}^{2}B(r)}{\mathrm{d} r^{2}}.$$

It is often convenient to express convexity via the modified duration. Define the modified duration by
$$D(r) = -\,\frac{1}{B(r)}\,\frac{\mathrm{d}B(r)}{\mathrm{d} r}.$$
Equivalently,
$$\frac{\mathrm{d}B(r)}{\mathrm{d} r} = -\,D(r)\,B(r).$$

Differentiating the identity $\tfrac{\mathrm{d}B}{\mathrm{d} r} = -D(r)\,B(r)$ gives
$$\frac{\mathrm{d}^{2}B(r)}{\mathrm{d} r^{2}}
= -\,\frac{\mathrm{d}D(r)}{\mathrm{d} r}\,B(r)\;-\;D(r)\,\frac{\mathrm{d}B(r)}{\mathrm{d} r}
= \Bigl(D(r)^{2} - \frac{\mathrm{d}D(r)}{\mathrm{d} r}\Bigr) B(r).$$

Therefore,
$$C(r) = \frac{1}{B(r)}\,\frac{\mathrm{d}^{2}B(r)}{\mathrm{d} r^{2}} = D(r)^{2} - \frac{\mathrm{d}D(r)}{\mathrm{d} r}.$$

Here $D(r)$ denotes the modified duration defined above.

=== How bond duration changes with a changing interest rate ===
For yields quoted with periodic (discrete) compounding at rate $y$ per period, the modified duration is:
$$D(y) = \frac{1}{1+y}\,\sum_{i=1}^{n}\frac{P_i\,t_i}{B}.$$
Here $P_i$ is the present value of cash flow $i$, and $t_i$ is its payment time.

As the interest rate increases, the present value of longer-dated payments declines in relation to earlier coupons (by the discount factor between the early and late payments). However, bond price also declines when interest rate increases, but changes in the present value of sum of each coupons times timing (the numerator in the summation) are larger than changes in the bond price (the denominator in the summation). Therefore, increases in r must decrease the duration (or, in the case of zero-coupon bonds, leave the unmodified duration constant). Note that the modified duration D differs from the regular duration by the factor one over 1 + r (shown above), which also decreases as r is increased.

$$\frac{\mathrm{d}D(r)}{\mathrm{d} r} \le 0.$$

From the identity above, convexity is positive for option-free bonds.

Convexity is positive for option-free bonds. Under a flat, continuously compounded curve,
$$B(r)=\sum_{i=1}^{n} c_i\,\mathrm{e}^{-r t_i}.$$
Differentiating twice,
$$\frac{\mathrm{d}^{2}B(r)}{\mathrm{d} r^{2}}
=\sum_{i=1}^{n} c_i\,t_i^{2}\,\mathrm{e}^{-r t_i}\;\ge\;0,$$
hence $C(r)=\frac{1}{B(r)}\,\frac{\mathrm{d}^{2}B(r)}{\mathrm{d} r^{2}}\ge 0$.

For duration, define present-value weights

$w_i=\dfrac{c_i\,\mathrm{e}^{-r t_i}}{B(r)}$ (so $\sum_{i=1}^{n} w_i=1$).

Then $D(r)=\sum_{i=1}^{n} w_i t_i$, and
$$\frac{\mathrm{d}D(r)}{\mathrm{d} r}
=\,-\sum_{i=1}^{n} w_i\bigl(t_i-D(r)\bigr)^{2}\;\le\;0,$$
with equality only for a single cash flow (a zero-coupon bond).

== Application of convexity ==
Convexity and duration are standard one-factor risk measures for parallel shifts in the yield curve. Duration controls the first-order price sensitivity and convexity the second-order term; together they are used to estimate and hedge interest-rate risk. A portfolio is first-order hedged when its (dollar) duration is close to zero versus a benchmark; adding a convexity match reduces second-order exposure for larger shifts.

For a small parallel yield change Δy, the second-order Taylor approximation of price is
$$\frac{\Delta B}{B} \;\approx\; -\,D\,\Delta y \;+\; \tfrac{1}{2}\,C\,(\Delta y)^2,$$
or, in dollar terms,
$$\Delta B \;\approx\; -\,B\,D\,\Delta y \;+\; \tfrac{1}{2}\,B\,C\,(\Delta y)^2.$$
These formulae are standard and underpin duration- and convexity-based hedging.

For portfolios with the same duration, higher convexity (e.g., a “barbell” of short- and long-dated bonds versus a “bullet” concentrated near one maturity) improves second-order behaviour: gains when yields fall are larger than losses when yields rise of the same size.

== Effective convexity ==
For bonds with embedded options, price depends on how the yield curve move alters expected cash flows via option exercise. Standard, yield-to-maturity-based duration and convexity assume fixed cash flows and so miss this effect. In such cases, effective convexity is obtained numerically.

Effective convexity is a centred finite difference approximation to the second derivative of price with respect to the yield level:

$$\text{Effective convexity}
\;=\;
\frac{V_{-\Delta y}\;-\;2V_{0}\;+\;V_{+\Delta y}}{V_{0}\,(\Delta y)^{2}}.$$

Here $V$ is the model price (from an option-pricing framework), $\Delta y$ is the size of a parallel shift in the curve, and $V_{-\Delta y}$ and $V_{+\Delta y}$ are the corresponding prices when yields fall or rise by $\Delta y$, respectively.

In practice the prices $V_{-\Delta y}$, $V_{0}$ and $V_{+\Delta y}$ are computed from an interest-rate model that re-values the whole curve and the option at each node (for example, a short-rate lattice - see Lattice model (finance) § Interest rate derivatives).

== See also ==
- Black–Scholes equation
- Bond duration
- Bond valuation
- Fixed-income attribution § First principles versus perturbational attribution
- Greeks (finance)
- Immunization (finance)
- List of convexity topics
- List of finance topics
