= Maturity (finance) =

Date on which the final payment is due on a loan or other financial instrument

In finance, maturity or maturity date is the date on which the final payment is due on a loan or other financial instrument, such as a bond or term deposit, at which point the principal (and all remaining interest) is due to be paid.

Most instruments have a fixed maturity date which is a specific date on which the instrument matures. Such instruments include fixed interest and variable rate loans or debt instruments, however called, and other forms of security such as redeemable preference shares, provided their terms of issue specify a maturity date. It is similar in meaning to "redemption date".

Some instruments have no fixed maturity date which continue indefinitely (unless repayment is agreed between the borrower and the lenders at some point) and may be known as "perpetual stocks". Some instruments have a range of possible maturity dates, and such stocks can usually be repaid at any time within that range, as chosen by the borrower.

A serial maturity is when bonds are all issued at the same time but are divided into different classes with different, staggered redemption dates.

In the financial press, the term "maturity" is sometimes used as shorthand for the security itself, for example, In the market today the yields on ten-year maturities increased means the prices of bonds due to mature in ten years fell, and thus the redemption yield on those bonds increased.

== See also ==
- Deferred financing cost
- Rolling (finance)
- Maturity transformation
