= Laddering =

Investment strategy using staggered-maturity financial instruments

Laddering is an investment technique that requires investors to purchase multiple financial products with different maturity dates or "rungs". The technique provides diversification, and thereby yield stability.

== Benefits ==
Laddering avoids the risk of reinvesting a large portion of assets in an unfavorable financial environment. Each "rung" of the ladder is a bond of a specific maturity date and the "height" of the ladder is the difference between the shortest maturity bond and the longest maturity bond. The more rungs in the ladder (10 or more is recommended), the better the diversification, the more stable the yield, and the higher the average yield. For example, a person has both a 2015 matured CD and a 2018 matured CD. Even if the interest rate is low in 2015 when one certificate is to be renewed, half of the income is locked in until 2018.

Laddering can free up capital as needed and can also be used as an overall retirement planning approach for all retirement investments. The idea is to separate CDs, cash, bonds, annuities, and others into different "ladders" (or "buckets" or "baskets") depending on when the asset is expected to be liquidated to fund the retirement revenue stream. Low-risk assets are used at the start of retirement (and usually have an expected lower rate of return, due to lacking a risk premium). Higher-risk assets would be placed in a basket used at the end of retirement.

This strategy is useful for a diversified portfolio, with other assets in the stock market etc.

== Types of laddering ==
=== Bond laddering ===
A bond ladder is a series of bonds with different maturity dates. A person may purchase a shorter term bond in the event that he needs the capital soon to fund his children's tuition while purchasing other longer term bonds that mature later as retirement spending with a more favorable rate, assuming the economy is experiencing a normal yield curve during this time.

Generally an initial investment of $10,000-$20,000 is required in order to purchase 5-10 bonds with different maturities for a specific timeline.

=== IPO laddering ===
Laddering also describes a process where, in order to purchase shares at a given price, investors must also agree to purchase additional shares at a higher price. This artificially inflates the price of the stock and allows insiders to buy at the lower price, with a guarantee that they will be able to sell at a higher price. This practice has resulted in investigations of national and global banks by the SEC after the stock market collapse.
