= Project finance model =

Specialized financial model

Example: Input for a thermal power plant model
For a thermal power plant project, a project finance model's input typically looks as follows:
- Power plant's installed capacity, MW
- Capacity utilization factor
- Internal consumption rate, %
- Power plant's gross efficiency, %
- Lower heat value of fuel, MJ/unit
- Price of fuel, $/unit
- Offtake electricity price, $/MWh
- Inflation rate, %
- Fuel price escalation, % per year
- Electricity price escalation, % per year
- Cost of consumables, $/MWh
- Equipment maintenance, $/MWh
- Depreciation period, years
- Personnel expenses, $ per year
- General and administrative expenses, $ per year
- Corporate tax rate, %
- Total CAPEX $
- 'Buffer' for cost overruns, % of total amount to be financed
- Fuel and consumables reserve, days
- Imported equipment, % of total CAPEX
- Import duties, %
- Initial insurance premium, % of total CAPEX
- Construction period, years
- Period of commercial operation, years
- Equity portion in total financing, %
- Required return on equity, %
- Tenor of debt, years
- Grace period on debt repayment, years
- Interest rate during construction, %
- Interest rate during commercial operation, %

A project finance model is a specialized financial model, the purpose of which is to assess the economic feasibility of the project in question. The model's output can also be used in structuring, or "sculpting", the project finance deal.

== Context ==
Project finance is the long-term financing of infrastructure and industrial projects based upon the projected cash flows of the project - rather than the balance sheets of its sponsors. The project is therefore only feasible when the project is capable of producing enough cash to cover all operating and debt-servicing expenses over the whole tenor of the debt.

Most importantly, therefore, the model is used to determine the maximum amount of debt the project company (Special-purpose entity) can maintain - and the corresponding debt repayment profile; there are several related metrics here, the most important of which is arguably the Debt Service Coverage Ratio (DSCR) - the financial metric that measures the ability of a project to generate enough cash flow to cover principal and interest payments.

== Model structure ==
The general structure of any financial model is standard: (i) input (ii) calculation algorithm (iii) output; see Financial forecast. While the output for a project finance model is more or less uniform, and the calculation is predetermined by accounting rules, the input is highly project-specific. Generally, the model can be subdivided into the following categories:

- Variables needed for forecasting revenues
- Variables needed for forecasting expenses
- Capital expenditures
- Financing

A model is usually built for a most probable (or base) case. Then, a model sensitivity analysis is conducted to determine effects of changes in input variables on key outputs, such as internal rate of return (IRR), net present value (NPV) and payback period.

For discussion (a) re cash-flow modelling, see Valuation using discounted cash flows § Determine cash flow for each forecast period; and (b) re model "calibration", and sensitivity- and scenario analysis, see § Determine equity value there.

Practically, these are usually built as Excel spreadsheets and then consist of the following interlinked sheets (see Outline of finance § Financial modeling for further model-build items), with broad groupings:

- Project build and operation (Data input): operating assumptions; Capital costs (construction); Insurance; Taxes; Depreciation; Financing
- Corresponding financial statements: Income statement; Balance sheet; Cash flow statement
- Resultant project metrics: Retained earnings; Coverage ratios; Present values

== Metrics in assessing a project ==
As stated above, the model is used to determine the most appropriate amount of debt the project company should take: in any year the debt service coverage ratio (DSCR) should not exceed a predetermined level. DSCR is also used as a measure of riskiness of the project and, therefore, as a determinant of interest rate on debt. Minimal DSCR set for a project depends on riskiness of the project, i.e. on predictability and stability of cash flow generated by it.

Related to this is the Project life cover ratio (PLCR), the ratio of the net present value of the cash flow over the remaining full life of the project to the outstanding debt balance in the period. It is a measure of the number of times the cash flow over the life of the project can repay the outstanding debt balance. The Loan life cover ratio (LLCR), similarly is the ratio of the net present value of the cash flow over the scheduled life of the loan to the outstanding debt balance in the period. Other ratios of this sort include:

- Cash flow available for debt service
- Drawdown cover ratio
- Historic debt service cover ratio
- Projected debt service cover ratio
- Repayment cover ratio

Standard profitability metrics are also considered - most commonly, Internal rate of return (IRR), Return on assets (ROA), and Return on equity (ROE)

== Debt sculpting ==
Debt sculpting is common in the financial modelling of a project. It means that the principal repayment obligations have been calculated to ensure that the principal and interest obligations are appropriately matched to the strength and pattern of the cashflows in each period. The most common ways to do so are to manually adjust the principal repayment in each period, or to algebraically solve the principal repayment to achieve a desired DSCR.

== See also ==
- Project finance
- project risk management
- power purchase agreement
