= Mr. Money Mustache =

Personal finance blog

- Website type: Personal finance blog
- Available in: English
- Owner: Peter Jonathan Adeney
- Creator: Peter Jonathan Adeney
- Revenue: $400,000 annually as of 2017
- Website: www.mrmoneymustache.com
- Launched: 2011; 15 years ago
- Current status: Active

Mr. Money Mustache is the website and pseudonym of Canadian-born blogger Peter Adeney. Adeney retired from his job as a software engineer in 2005 at age 30 by spending only a small percentage of his annual salary and consistently investing the remainder, primarily in stock market index funds.

Adeney lives in Longmont, Colorado, and contends that most middle-class individuals can and should spend less money and own fewer physical possessions. He argues that by doing this, they can live with increased financial freedom and happiness, reducing their environmental footprint in the process. He has described the typical middle-class lifestyle as "an exploding volcano of wastefulness," particularly citing the overuse of and overspending on new cars as an example. The blog has been featured and cited in various media outlets including MarketWatch, CBS News, and The New Yorker, as well as others.

== Retirement story ==
Pete Adeney retired at age 30. Adeney and his then-wife both worked in software engineering, averaging an income of approximately $67,000 per year, per person, over the course of their careers. They lived frugally, investing the majority of their take-home pay during their working years. At the time of their retirement, they had amassed approximately $600,000 in investments in addition to a mortgage-free house valued at about $200,000.

Adeney believes in the 4% rule, which states that, with a balanced investment portfolio, a retiree can withdraw 4% of their portfolio's initial value each year, adjusted upward for inflation each year thereafter, with a low probability of ever running out of money.

Adeney's portfolio was valued at $600,000 at the time of his retirement, which could support his family's annual expenditures of about $25,000 indefinitely according to this rule.

Adeney has made considerable money aside from his initial investment portfolio since he retired from his software engineering job in 2005, through the blog and other sources of income, but he maintains that none of this additional money was ever necessary to fund his family's normal expenses.

== Community ==
The website includes an active internet forum for discussion of personal finance matters outside of the blog's comment threads. People who read the Mr. Money Mustache blog and subscribe to its philosophy are known as "Mustachians."

Readers of the blog gather in person regularly at meetups around the world to share experiences and tips on how to live a lifestyle conducive to wealth building, early retirement, happiness, and environmentalism.

In 2017, Adeney introduced "The MMM World Headquarters Building," a physical location in Longmont, Colorado, dedicated to the Mustachian movement.

== Common topics ==
The blog's topics often include:

- Early retirement
- Financial independence
- Frugality and simple living
- Anti-consumerism
- Consumer debt
- The cost of driving cars
- Bicycling
- The philosophy of happiness
- Do-it-yourself work ethic
- Environmentalism
- Credit card churning and travel hacking

== See also ==
- FIRE movement
- Wax Mannequin, Canadian indie rock musician, and Adeney's brother
