= Annuities in the United States =

Type of structured insurance

In the United States, an annuity is a financial product which offers tax-deferred growth and which usually offers benefits such as an income for life. Typically these are offered as structured (insurance) products that each state approves and regulates in which case they are designed using a mortality table and mainly guaranteed by a life insurer. There are many different varieties of annuities sold by carriers. In a typical scenario, an investor (usually the annuitant) will make a single cash premium to own an annuity. After the policy is issued the owner may elect to annuitize the contract (start receiving payments) for a chosen period of time (e.g., 5, 10, 20 years, a lifetime). This process is called annuitization and can also provide a predictable, guaranteed stream of future income during retirement until the death of the annuitant (or joint annuitants). Alternatively, an investor can defer annuitizing their contract to get larger payments later, hedge long-term care cost increases, or maximize a lump sum death benefit for a named beneficiary.

== History ==
The idea of paying out a stream of income to an individual or family dates back to the Roman Empire. The Latin word annua meant annual stipends, and during the reign of the emperors, the word signified a contract that made annual payments. Individuals would make a single large payment into the annua and then receive an annual payment each year until death, or for a specified period of time. The Roman speculator and jurist Gnaeus Domitius Annius Ulpianus is cited as one of the earliest dealers of these annuities, and he is also credited with creating the first actuarial life table. Roman soldiers were paid annuities as a form of compensation for military service. During the Middle Ages, annuities were used by feudal lords and kings to help raise capital to cover the heavy costs of their constant wars and conflicts with each other. At this time, the most popular form of annuities were those offered in the form of a tontine, where the fixed annual payments were shared amongst a dwindling number of surviving members leading to ever increasing payments to the longest lived investors.

One of the early recorded uses of annuities in the United States was by the Presbyterian Church in 1720. The purpose was to provide a secure retirement to aging ministers and their families, and was later expanded to assist widows and orphans. In 1812, Pennsylvania Company Insurance was among the first to begin offering annuities to the general public in the United States. Some prominent figures who are noted for their use of annuities include: Benjamin Franklin assisting the cities of Boston and Philadelphia; Babe Ruth avoiding losses during the great depression, O. J. Simpson protecting his income from lawsuits and creditors. Ben Bernanke in 2006 disclosed that his major financial assets are two annuities.

== General ==
Annuity contracts in the United States are defined by the Internal Revenue Code and regulated by the individual states. Variable annuities have features of both life insurance and investment products. In the U.S., annuity insurance may be issued only by life insurance companies, although private annuity contracts may be arranged between willing parties although typically the intent of these is to reduce taxes. Insurance companies are regulated by the states, so contracts or options that may be available in some states may not be available in others. Their federal tax treatment, however, is governed by the Internal Revenue Code. Variable annuities are regulated by the Securities and Exchange Commission and the sale of variable annuities is overseen by the Financial Industry Regulatory Authority (FINRA) (the largest non-governmental regulator for all securities firms doing business in the United States).

There are two possible phases for an annuity, one phase in which the customer deposits and accumulates money into an account (the deferral phase), and another phase in which customers receive payments for some period of time (the annuity or income phase). During this latter phase, the insurance company makes income payments that may be set for a stated period of time, such as five years, or continue until the death of the customer(s) (the "annuitant(s)") named in the contract. Annuitization over a lifetime can have a death benefit guarantee over a certain period of time, such as ten years. Annuity contracts with a deferral phase always have an annuity phase and are called deferred annuities. An annuity contract may also be structured so that it has only the annuity phase; such a contract is called an immediate annuity. Note this is not always the case.

== Immediate annuity ==
The term "annuity", as used in financial theory, is most closely related to what is today called an immediate annuity. This is an insurance policy which, in exchange for a sum of money, guarantees that the issuer will make a series of payments. These payments may be either level or increasing periodic payments for a fixed term of years or until the ending of a life or two lives, or even whichever is longer. It is also possible to structure the payments under an immediate annuity so that they vary with the performance of a specified set of investments, usually bond and equity mutual funds. Such a contract is called a variable immediate annuity. See also life annuity, below.

The overarching characteristic of the immediate annuity is that it is a vehicle for distributing savings with a tax-deferred growth factor. A common use for an immediate annuity might be to provide a pension income. In the U.S., the tax treatment of a non-qualified immediate annuity is that every payment is a combination of a return of principal (which part is not taxed) and income (which is taxed at ordinary income rates, not capital gain rates). Immediate annuities funded as an IRA do not have any tax advantages, but typically the distribution satisfies the IRS RMD requirement and may satisfy the RMD requirement for other IRA accounts of the owner (see IRS Sec 1.401(a)(9)-6.)

When a deferred annuity is annuitized, it works like an immediate annuity from that point on, but with a lower cost basis and thus more of the payment is taxed.

=== Annuity with period certain ===
This type of immediate annuity pays the annuitant for a designated number of years (i.e., a period certain) and is used to fund a need that will end when the period is up (for example, it might be used to fund the premiums for a term life insurance policy). Thus the person may outlive the number of years the annuity will pay.

=== Life annuity ===
A life or lifetime immediate annuity is used to provide an income for the life of the annuitant similar to a defined benefit or pension plan.

A life annuity works somewhat like a loan that is made by the purchaser (contract owner) to the issuing (insurance) company, which pays back the original capital or principal (which isn't taxed) with interest and/or gains (which is taxed as ordinary income) to the annuitant on whose life the annuity is based. The assumed period of the loan is based on the life expectancy of the annuitant. In order to guarantee that the income continues for life, the insurance company relies on a concept called cross-subsidy or the "law of large numbers". Because an annuity population can be expected to have a distribution of lifespans around the population's mean (average) age, those dying earlier will give up income to support those living longer whose money would otherwise run out. Thus it is a form of longevity insurance (see also below).

A life annuity, ideally, can reduce the "problem" faced by a person when they don't know how long they will live, and so they don't know the optimal speed at which to spend their savings. Life annuities with payments indexed to the Consumer Price Index might be an acceptable solution to this problem, but there is only a thin market for them in North America.

==== Life annuity variants ====
For an additional expense (either by way of an increase in payments (premium) or a decrease in benefits), an annuity or benefit rider can be purchased on another life such as a spouse, family member or friend for the duration of whose life the annuity is wholly or partly guaranteed. For example, it is common to buy an annuity which will continue to pay out to the spouse of the annuitant after death, for so long as the spouse survives. The annuity paid to the spouse is called a reversionary annuity or survivorship annuity. However, if the annuitant is in good health, it may be more advantageous to select the higher payout option on his or her life only and purchase a life insurance policy that would pay income to the survivor.

The pure life annuity can have harsh consequences for the annuitant who dies before recovering his or her investment in the contract. Such a situation, called a forfeiture, can be mitigated by the addition of a period-certain feature under which the annuity issuer is required to make annuity payments for at least a certain number of years; if the annuitant outlives the specified period certain, annuity payments continue until the annuitant's death, and if the annuitant dies before the expiration of the period certain, the annuitant's estate or beneficiary is entitled to the remaining payments certain. The tradeoff between the pure life annuity and the life-with-period-certain annuity is that the annuity payment for the latter is smaller. A viable alternative to the life-with-period-certain annuity is to purchase a single-premium life policy that would cover the lost premium in the annuity.

Impaired-life annuities for smokers or those with a particular illness are also available from some insurance companies. Since the life expectancy is reduced, the annual payment to the purchaser is raised.

Life annuities are priced based on the probability of the annuitant surviving to receive the payments. Longevity insurance is a form of annuity that defers commencement of the payments until very late in life. A common longevity contract would be purchased at or before retirement but would not commence payments until 20 years after retirement. If the nominee dies before payments commence there is no payable benefit. This drastically reduces the cost of the annuity while still providing protection against outliving one's resources.

== Deferred annuity ==
The second usage for the term annuity came into being during the 1970s. Such a contract is more properly referred to as a deferred annuity and is chiefly a vehicle for accumulating savings with a view to eventually distributing them either in the manner of an immediate annuity or as a lump-sum payment.

All varieties of deferred annuities owned by individuals have one thing in common: any increase in account values is not taxed until those gains are withdrawn. This is also known as tax-deferred growth.

A deferred annuity which grows by interest rate earnings alone is called a fixed deferred annuity (FA). A deferred annuity that permits allocations to stock or bond funds and for which the account value is not guaranteed to stay above the initial amount invested is called a variable annuity (VA).

A new category of deferred annuity, called the fixed indexed annuity (FIA) emerged in 1995 (originally called an Equity-Indexed Annuity). Fixed indexed annuities may have features of both fixed and variable deferred annuities. The insurance company typically guarantees a minimum return for EIA. An investor can still lose money if he or she cancels (or surrenders) the policy early, before a "break even" period. An oversimplified expression of a typical FIA's rate of return might be that it is equal to a stated "participation rate" multiplied by a target stock market index's performance excluding dividends. Interest rate caps or an administrative fee may be applicable.

Deferred annuities in the United States have the advantage that taxation of all capital gains and ordinary income is deferred until withdrawn. In theory, such tax-deferred compounding allows more money to be put to work while the savings are accumulating, leading to higher returns. A disadvantage, however, is that when amounts held under a deferred annuity are withdrawn or inherited, the interest/gains are immediately taxed as ordinary income.

A type of deferred annuity, the Multi-Year Guaranteed Annuity (MYGA), offers a fixed interest rate for a specified number of years. MYGAs are typically used by conservative investors seeking stable returns over a set period, often as part of retirement income planning.

=== Features ===
A variety of features and guarantees have been developed by insurance companies in order to make annuity products more attractive. These include death and living benefit options, extra credit options, account guarantees, spousal continuation benefits, reduced contingent deferred sales charges (or surrender charges), and various combinations thereof. Each feature or benefit added to a contract will typically be accompanied by an additional expense either directly (billed to client) or indirectly (inside product).

Deferred annuities are usually divided into two different kinds:

- Fixed annuities offer some sort of guaranteed rate of return over the life of the contract. In general such contracts are often positioned to be somewhat like bank certificates of deposit (CDs) and offer a rate of return competitive with those of CDs of similar time frames. Many fixed annuities, however, do not have a fixed rate of return over the life of the contract, offering instead a guaranteed minimum rate and a first year introductory rate. The rate after the first year is often an amount that may be set at the insurance company's discretion subject, however, to the minimum amount (typically 3%). There are usually some provisions in the contract to allow a percentage of the interest and/or principal to be withdrawn early and without penalty (usually the interest earned in a 12-month period or 10%), unlike most CDs. Fixed annuities normally become fully liquid depending on the surrender schedule or upon the owner's death. Most equity index annuities are properly categorized as fixed annuities and their performance is typically tied to a stock market index (usually the S&P 500 or the Dow Jones Industrial Average). These products are guaranteed but are not as easy to understand as standard fixed annuities as there are usually caps, spreads, margins, and crediting methods that can reduce returns. These products also don't pay any of the participating market indices' dividends; the trade-off is that contract holder can never earn less than 0% in a negative year.
- Variable annuities allow money to be invested in insurance company "separate accounts" (which are sometimes referred to as "subaccounts" and in any case are functionally similar to mutual funds) in a tax-deferred manner. Their primary use is to allow an investor to engage in tax-deferred investing for retirement in amounts greater than permitted by individual retirement or 401(k) plans. In addition, many variable annuity contracts offer a guaranteed minimum rate of return (either for a future withdrawal and/or in the case of the owner's death), even if the underlying separate account investments perform poorly. This can be attractive to people uncomfortable investing in the equity markets without the guarantees. Of course, an investor will pay for each benefit provided by a variable annuity, since insurance companies must charge a premium to cover the insurance guarantees of such benefits. Variable annuities are regulated both by the individual states (as insurance products) and by the Securities and Exchange Commission (as securities under the federal securities laws). The SEC requires that all of the charges under variable annuities be described in great detail in the prospectus that is offered to each variable annuity customer. Of course, potential customers should review these charges carefully, just as one would in purchasing mutual fund shares. People who sell variable annuities are usually regulated by FINRA, whose rules of conduct require a careful analysis of the suitability of variable annuities (and other securities products) to those to whom they recommend such products. These products are often criticized as being sold to the wrong persons, who could have done better investing in a more suitable alternative, since the commissions paid under this product are often high relative to other investment products.

There are several types of performance guarantees, and one may often choose them à la carte, with higher risk charges for guarantees that are riskier for the insurance companies. The first type is a guaranteed minimum death benefit (GMDB), which can be received only if the owner of the annuity contract, or the covered annuitant, dies.

GMDBs come in various flavors, in order of increasing risk to the insurance company:

- Return of premium (a guarantee that you will not have a negative return)
- Roll-up of premium at a particular rate (a guarantee that you will achieve a minimum rate of return, greater than 0)
- Maximum anniversary value (looks back at account value on the anniversaries, and guarantees you will get at least as much as the highest values upon death)
- Greater of maximum anniversary value or particular roll-up

Insurance companies provide even greater insurance coverage on guaranteed living benefits, which tend to be elective. Unlike death benefits, which the contractholder generally cannot time, living benefits pose significant risk for insurance companies as contractholders will likely exercise these benefits when they are worth the most. Annuities with guaranteed living benefits (GLBs) tend to have high fees commensurate with the additional risks underwritten by the issuing insurer.

Some GLB examples, in no particular order:

- Guaranteed minimum income benefit (GMIB, a guarantee that one will get a minimum income stream upon annuitization at a particular point in the future)
- Guaranteed minimum accumulation lbenefit (GMAB, a guarantee that the account value will be at a certain amount at a certain point in the future)
- Guaranteed minimum withdrawal benefit (GMWB, a guarantee similar to the income benefit, but one that doesn't require annuitizing)
- Guaranteed-for-life income benefit (a guarantee similar to a withdrawal benefit, where withdrawals begin and continue until cash value becomes zero, withdrawals stop when cash value is zero and then annuitization occurs on the guaranteed benefit amount for a payment amount that is not determined until annuitization date.)
- Guaranteed Lifetime Withdrawal Benefits (GLWB, a guarantee similar to the income benefit, but one that doesn't require annuitizing, payments continue for life regardless if the cash value goes to zero.)

Recently, insurance companies developed asset-transfer programs that operate at the contract level or the fund level. In the former, a percentage of client's account value will be transferred to a designated low-risk fund when the contract has poor investment performance. On the fund level, certain investment options have a target volatility built within the fund (usually about 10%) and will re-balance to maintain that target. In both cases, they are stated to help buffer poor investment performance until markets perform better (where they will transition back to normal allocations to catch an upswing). However, there are criticisms of these programs including, but not limited to, often mandating these programs on clients, restricting flexibility of investing, and not catching the upswing of markets fast enough due to the underlying design of such programs.

Be careful in regard to using GLB riders in non-qualified contracts as most of the products in the annuity marketplace today create a 100% taxable income benefit whereas income generated from an immediate annuity in a non-qualified contract would partially be a return of principal and therefore non-taxable.

=== Criticisms of deferred annuities ===
Some annuities do not have any deferred surrender charges and do not pay the financial professional a commission, although the financial professional may charge a fee for his or her advice. These contracts are called "no-load" variable annuity products and are usually available from a fee-based financial planner or directly from a no-load mutual fund company. Of course various charges are still imposed on these contracts, but they are less than those sold by commissioned brokers. It is important that potential purchasers of annuities, mutual funds, tax-exempt municipal bonds, commodities futures, interest rate swaps, in short, any financial instrument understand the fees on the product and the fees a financial planner may charge.

Variable annuities are controversial because many believe the extra fees (i.e., the fees above and beyond those charged for similar retail mutual funds that offer no principal protection or guarantees of any kind) may reduce the rate of return compared to what the investor could make by investing directly in similar investments outside of the variable annuity. A big selling point for variable annuities is the guarantees many have, such as the guarantee that the customer will not lose his or her principal. Critics say that these guarantees are not necessary because over the long term the market has always been positive, while others say that with the uncertainty of the financial markets many investors simply will not invest without guarantees. Past returns are no guarantee of future performance, of course, and different investors have different risk tolerances, different investment horizons, different family situations, and so on. The sale of any security product should involve a careful analysis of the suitability of the product for a given individual.

== Taxation ==
In the U.S. Internal Revenue Code, the growth of the annuity value during the accumulation phase is tax-deferred, that is, not subject to current income tax, for annuities owned by individuals. The tax deferred status of deferred annuities has led to their common usage in the United States. Under the U.S. tax code, the benefits from annuity contracts do not always have to be taken in the form of a fixed stream of payments (annuitization), and many annuity contracts are bought primarily for the tax benefits rather than to receive a fixed stream of income. If an annuity is used in a qualified pension plan or an IRA funding vehicle, then 100% of the annuity payment is taxable as current income upon distribution (because the taxpayer has no tax basis in any of the money in the annuity). This is the same tax treatment of direct participation in a qualified pension plan (such as a 401K), again, due to the fact the taxpayer has no tax basis in any of the money in the plan. If the annuity contract is purchased with after-tax dollars, then the contract holder upon annuitization recovers his basis pro-rata in the ratio of basis divided by the expected value, according to the tax regulation Section 1.72-5. (This is commonly referred to as the exclusion ratio.) After the taxpayer has recovered all of his basis, then 100% of the payments thereafter are subject to ordinary income tax.

Since the Jobs and Growth Tax Relief Reconciliation Act of 2003, the use of variable annuities as a tax shelter has greatly diminished, because the growth of mutual funds and now most of the dividends of the fund are taxed at long term capital gains rates. This taxation, contrasted with the taxation of all the growth of variable annuities at income rates, means that in most cases, variable annuities shouldn't be used for tax shelters unless very long holding periods apply (for example, more than 20 years).

== Insurance company default risk and state guaranty associations ==
An investor should consider the financial strength of the insurance company that writes annuity contracts. Major insolvencies have occurred at least 62 times since the conspicuous collapse of the Executive Life Insurance Company in 1991.

Insurance company defaults are governed by state law. The laws are, however, broadly similar in most states. Annuity contracts are protected against insurance company insolvency up to a specific dollar limit, often $100,000, but as high as $500,000 in New York , New Jersey , and the state of Washington . California is the only state that has a limit less than 100%; the limit is 80% up to $300,000. This protection is not insurance and is not provided by a government agency. It is provided by an entity called the state guaranty association. When an insolvency occurs, the guaranty association steps in to protect annuity holders, and decides what to do on a case-by-case basis. Sometimes the contracts will be taken over and fulfilled by a solvent insurance company.

The state guaranty association is not a government agency, but states usually require insurance companies to belong to it as a condition of being licensed to do business. The guaranty associations of the fifty states are members of a national umbrella association, the National Organization of Life and Health Insurance Guaranty Associations (NOLHGA). The NOLHGA website provides a description of the organization, links to websites for the individual state organizations, and links to the actual text of the governing state laws.

A difference between guaranty association protection and the protection of bank accounts by the FDIC, credit union accounts by the NCUA, and brokerage accounts by the SIPC, is that it is difficult for consumers to learn about this protection. Usually, state law prohibits insurance agents and companies from using the guaranty association in any advertising and agents are prohibited by statute from using this Web site or the existence of the guaranty association as an inducement to purchase insurance(e.g., ). Presumably, this is a response to concerns by stronger insurance companies about moral hazard.

== Compensation for advisors or salespeople ==
Deferred annuities, including fixed, fixed indexed and variable, typically pay the advisor or salesperson 1 percent to 10 percent of the amount invested as a commission, with possible trail options of 25 basis points to 1 percent. Sometimes the advisor can select his payout option, which might be either 7 or 10 percent up front, or 5 percent up front with a 25 basis point trail, or 1 percent to 3 percent up front with a 1 percent trail. Trail commissions are most common in variable annuities while fixed annuities and fixed indexed annuities typically pay an up front commission.

Some firms allow an investor to pick an annuity share class, which determines the salesperson's commission schedule. The main variables are the up-front commission and the trail commission.

Fixed and Indexed Annuity commissions are paid to the agent by the insurance companies the agent represents. Commissions are not paid by the client (annuitant).

"No-load" variable annuities are available on a direct-to-consumer basis from several no-load mutual fund companies. "No-load" means the products have no sales commissions or surrender charges.
