= Nairobi Community Media House =

Nairobi Community Media House is an organization that rooted in the Nairobi slum, Kenya, that recruits and trains young people in filmmaking and editing. In 2010, the Voices of Africa Media Foundation launched the Nairobi Community Media House to train talented young people (20–25 years old) from the Nairobi many slums to become professional media filmmakers. The trainees also learn how to make money, allowing them to become financially independent reporters. The mission of Nairobi Community Media House is: Give the slums a voice

== Current Programs ==
One of the programs is the video reports African Slum Journal. Another program is called Bunge Mtaani. The title is Kiswahili for “Parliament of the streets” and is meant to strengthen the citizens’ participation.
