= Grant Sabatier =

American author and entrepreneur

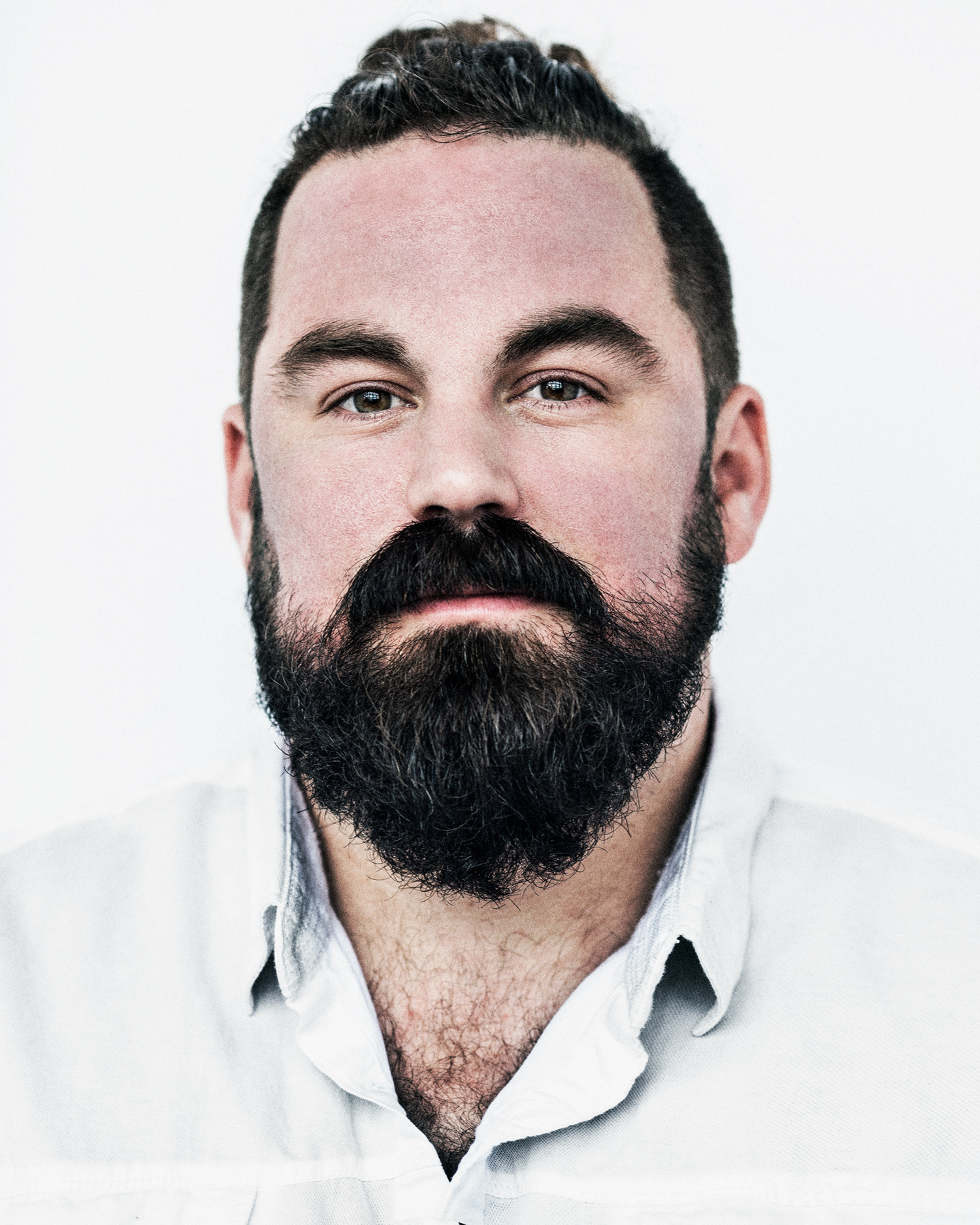
- Born: Grant Sabatier; December 13, 1984 (age 41)
- Education: University of Chicago
- Occupations: Author; Entrepreneur; Podcaster; Blogger
- Title: Author of Financial Freedom; Creator of Millennial Money
- Website: grantsabatier.com

Grant Sabatier (born December 13, 1984) is an American author, podcaster, and entrepreneur. He is best known for his international bestselling book Financial Freedom (2019). Sabatier also founded a personal finance website, Millennial Money and hosted the podcast Financial Freedom. He is currently the CEO of MMG Media Group, a company that owns personal finance websites. Grant is also the owner of Clintonville Books and Columbus Rare Books.

== Life ==
Grant grew up in Falls Church, Virginia, went to George Mason High School, and then attended the University of Chicago where he studied philosophy. In 2010, at age 24, Sabatier was unable to find a job, so he taught himself digital marketing. Several months later, Sabatier was hired at a digital marketing agency. After reading more than 300 personal finance books and realizing that retirement seemed unattainable at his current salary, he quit to start a consulting business.

Despite the rapid growth of the consulting business, Sabatier consciously avoided lifestyle inflation. By saving more than 80% of his six-figure income, Sabatier amassed $1.25 million and reached financial independence by age 30.

== Works ==
Sabatier's first book, Financial Freedom: A Proven Path to All the Money You Will Ever Need, (published by Penguin Random House on February 5, 2019) has been translated into 15 languages and is popular in the FIRE movement. The book chronicles his efforts to reach financial independence at a young age and includes a step-by-step framework designed to help readers do the same. In 2020, LinkedIn Learning optioned the rights of the book and released a course designed around its content. Grant's second Book Inner Entrepreneur: A Proven Path to Profit and Peace was published by Penguin Random House on March 12, 2025.

Sabatier has hosted or co-hosted two podcasts, including hosting "Financial Freedom", on which he interviewed guests about making money and living meaningful lives; co-hosting "Millennial Money Minutes", whose five-minute episodes discussed personal finance topics.

Sabatier's blog, "Millennial Money", aimed to help others "make smarter financial decisions, build more successful companies, reach financial independence and live richer lives. It was acquired by the Motley Fool in October 2020 and was re-acquired by Sabatier through his company MMG Media Group in July 2022.
