= FIRE movement =

Movement whose goal is financial independence and retiring early

The Financial Independence, Retire Early (FIRE) movement is a personal finance phenomenon characterized by high savings rates—often exceeding the 10–15% typically recommended by financial planners—and aggressive investment, with the goal of accumulating sufficient assets to cover living expenses without traditional employment. The movement gained traction among millennials in the 2010s, spreading through blogs, podcasts, and online communities.

Participants in the FIRE movement typically seek to reduce expenses and maximize savings, building investment portfolios intended to generate passive income. A common framework advocated within the community involves spending less than one earns, investing the surplus, and minimizing debt. The most frequently cited savings target is based on the 4% rule, introduced by financial planner William Bengen in 1994, which suggests that a retirement portfolio equal to 25 times annual expenses can sustain long-term withdrawals.

Some researchers, including economist Karsten Jeske, have argued that early retirees—facing potentially 50+ years of retirement—should use more conservative withdrawal rates of 3.25–3.5%.

Implementation of FIRE strategies generally involves structured budgeting, consistent investing, and careful planning around long-term withdrawal rates.

== Background ==
=== Examples ===
Writings on FIRE often illustrate the effect of different savings rates on the time required to accumulate savings that cover living expenses. Assuming expenses equal income minus savings, and setting aside investment returns, the relationship can be expressed as:

$\text{Years of work} = \frac{1 - \tfrac{\text{savings}}{\text{income}}}{\tfrac{\text{savings}}{\text{income}}}$

For example:

- At a savings rate of 10%, it takes (1-0.1)/0.1 = 9 years of work to save for 1 year of living expenses.
- At a savings rate of 25%, it takes (1-0.25)/0.25 = 3 years of work to save for 1 year of living expenses.
- At a savings rate of 50%, it takes (1-0.5)/0.5 = 1 year of work to save for 1 year of living expenses.
- At a savings rate of 75%, it takes (1-0.75)/0.75 = 1/3 year = 4 months of work to save for 1 year of living expenses.

This framework is used within the FIRE community to highlight how higher savings rates can reduce the time needed to reach financial independence. Based on this reasoning, advocates often aim for savings rates of 50% or more of income. At a 75% savings rate, ignoring investment growth, it would take fewer than 10 years to accumulate 25 times annual living expenses. This savings rate is sometimes associated with the 4% rule for sustainable withdrawals.

Some commentators caution that investment returns, inflation, taxes, and lifestyle changes make actual timelines more variable. Online FIRE calculators allow individuals to model these projections with additional variables such as investment returns, inflation, and current portfolio size.

=== Subcategories ===
Commentators and participants in the FIRE movement have described several commonly discussed variations:

- LeanFIRE: emphasizes achieving financial independence by maintaining very low living expenses, allowing a smaller investment portfolio to be sufficient.
- FatFIRE: refers to pursuing early retirement while maintaining or exceeding a middle-class standard of living, requiring a larger savings target than LeanFIRE.
- CoastFIRE: involves saving and investing aggressively in the early years until the portfolio is projected to grow to a sufficient level through compound interest alone, after which further contributions may be reduced or stopped.
- BaristaFIRE: describes semi-retirement supported by part-time or lower-stress work, which may also provide benefits such as health insurance. Day-to-day expenses are covered through a mix of employment income and modest portfolio withdrawals. The investment portfolio is meant to grow with this approach.

=== Social media presence ===
Online communities, including subreddits dedicated to various FIRE subgroups and forums on independent FIRE blogs, have served as the primary medium through which the movement has spread and developed.

== History ==
The main ideas behind the FIRE movement originate from the 1992 best-selling book Your Money or Your Life written by Vicki Robin and Joe Dominguez, as well as the 2010 book Early Retirement Extreme by Jacob Lund Fisker. These works provide a basic template for a lifestyle of simple living with investment income to achieve financial independence. The latter book describes the relationship between savings rate and time to retirement. This allows individuals to quickly project their retirement date, given an assumed level of income and expenses.

The Mr. Money Mustache blog, started by Peter Adeney in 2011, generated interest in achieving early retirement through frugality and helped popularize the FIRE movement. Other books, blogs, and podcasts continue to refine and promote the FIRE concept.

In 2018, traditional mainstream media outlets gave significant coverage to the FIRE movement. According to a 2018 survey conducted by the Harris Poll later that year, 11% of wealthier Americans aged 45 and older have heard of the FIRE movement by name. Another 26% are aware of the concept.

Grant Sabatier, author of the 2019 book Financial Freedom, popularized the idea of side hustling as a path to accelerate financial independence.

== Geographic arbitrage ==
A commonly discussed strategy within the FIRE community is geographic arbitrage (also called geoarbitrage), in which a participant moves from a high-cost-of-living area to a lower-cost-of-living area while maintaining a similar level of income, often through remote work. The term was popularised by Tim Ferriss in his 2007 book The 4-Hour Workweek.

Within the United States, this can mean relocating to a state with no state income tax (such as Texas, Florida, or Tennessee) or to a smaller metropolitan area; internationally, popular destinations among Americans pursuing FIRE include Mexico, Portugal, Thailand and Colombia, where housing, healthcare and daily expenses are typically a fraction of US costs. US citizens living abroad for 330 or more days in a calendar year may also exclude a portion of foreign earned income from US federal income tax under the Foreign Earned Income Exclusion.

Mainstream coverage of geographic arbitrage in the FIRE context has profiled individual practitioners, such as a former Texas teacher who moved to Mexico City in 2020, accepting a 37 percent pay cut while reporting substantially lower living costs and improved quality of life.

Reported drawbacks include distance from family and existing social networks, variable healthcare quality, the complexity of visa and tax-residency rules, and the risk that exchange-rate movements may erode the cost-of-living advantage.

== Challenges ==
=== Healthcare ===
In the United States, early retirees face significant challenges securing health insurance before becoming eligible for Medicare at age 65. Without employer-sponsored coverage, options include purchasing insurance through the Affordable Care Act marketplace, COBRA continuation coverage, or relying on a spouse's employer plan. According to the Kaiser Family Foundation, a 62-year-old purchasing unsubsidized ACA coverage paid an average of $1,116 per month for a silver-tier plan in 2025. Financial analysts have noted that healthcare costs can significantly impact FIRE calculations, with one estimate suggesting a 35-year-old retiring at 50 could face approximately $380,000 in healthcare costs before Medicare eligibility. This concern is often cited in discussions of BaristaFIRE, where part-time work at companies like Starbucks provides access to employer health benefits. In contrast, early retirees in countries with universal health care—including the United Kingdom, Canada, and much of Western Europe—do not face similar healthcare-related financial barriers, as coverage is typically not tied to employment status.

=== Tax-advantaged account access ===
In the United States, early retirees must navigate rules governing access to tax-advantaged retirement accounts, which typically impose a 10% penalty on withdrawals before age 59 1/2. Several strategies exist to access these funds without penalty:

- The Roth IRA conversion ladder involves systematically converting pre-tax retirement funds to a Roth IRA, paying income tax on the conversion, then withdrawing the converted principal after a five-year waiting period.
- Rule of 55 allows penalty-free withdrawals from an employer-sponsored 401(k) or 403(b) plan if the account holder separates from employment in or after the year they turn 55.
- 72(t) Substantially Equal Periodic Payments (SEPP) permits penalty-free withdrawals from IRAs or 401(k)s if taken as a series of substantially equal payments over five years or until age 59 1/2, whichever is longer.

Many FIRE practitioners also utilize taxable brokerage accounts to fund the gap between early retirement and age 59 1/2, as these accounts have no withdrawal penalties and may qualify for favorable capital gains tax treatment.

== Criticism ==
The FIRE movement promotes frugality as a means to save for the future. Saving may be impossible for lower-income workers who must be frugal just to meet expenses. Critics cite the challenges of attaining high savings rates on a modest income, and note that some FIRE enthusiasts, such as Peter Adeney of Mr. Money Mustache, had high-paying jobs in fields like software engineering.

Critics suggest early retirees may not be setting aside enough funds for safe withdrawals during retirement. Tanja Hester and economist Karsten Jeske advocate for a conservative safe withdrawal rate of 3.5% or less, rather than the 4% rate cited in some retirement articles.

This adjustment requires accumulating approximately 30 or more times one's annual expenses, rather than the commonly-cited 25 times.

== See also ==
- Asset/liability modeling
- Dividend
- Do-it-yourself investing
- Downshifting (lifestyle)
- List of books about investing
- Individual pension plan
- Lists of occupations
- Pension
- Retirement Insurance Benefits
- Retirement spend down
- Simple living
