= 4% rule =

Retirement rule-of-thumb

The 4% rule (sometimes called the rule of 25) is a widely-cited retirement spend-down rule-of-thumb, credited to William Bengen, that says that a retiree can safely withdraw an inflation-adjusted 4% of their investments each year during a 30-year retirement. Since its publishing in the Journal of Financial Planning in 1994, the rule has been widely discussed in retirement planning literature and popular media.

The 4% rule was created by simulating 30-year retirement periods using the historical performance of the United States markets starting in 1926. The analysis assumed the retiree's portfolio was in a tax free account composed of United States stocks and bonds. Bengen picked 4% as the highest rate that never failed in the dataset.

In 1998, Bengen's rule was further supported and popularized by the Trinity study.

== Definition ==
The original formulation of the rule was:

Assuming a minimum requirement of 30 years of portfolio longevity, a first-year withdrawal of 4 percent, followed by inflation-adjusted withdrawals in subsequent years, should be safe.

— William Bengen, Determining Withdrawal Rates Using Historical Data

This version of the rule assumed the retirement portfolio was allocated between 50% bonds and 50% stocks and 25% bonds and 75% stocks. He used intermediate-term United States Treasury bonds to determine the bonds' historical returns and American large-cap stocks for stocks' returns. No taxes or fees were accounted for in the rule's analysis. Bengen defined "safe" to mean that in no 30-year rolling period did the portfolio run out of money.

In the Trinity study, the rule was expressed as:

For stock-dominated portfolios, withdrawal rates of 3% and 4% represent exceedingly conservative behavior. At these rates, retirees who wish to bequeath large estates to their heirs will likely be successful

— Retirement Savings: Choosing a Withdrawal Rate That Is Sustainable

The rule can alternately be described as "you need to save 25 times your annual expenses to safely retire".

== Criticism ==
A number of criticisms have been levied against the 4% rule. Some have suggested the rate is dangerously high, and others have warned that it will lead retirees to die with large unspent surpluses.

Bengen's original analysis relied exclusively on United States domestic markets in the 1900s, which was a period of unusually strong asset returns. Wade Pfau repeated Bengen's methodology with other developed countries' domestic markets and found that the 4% withdrawal rate was only safe in 4 of 14 countries. Pfau estimated in 2020 that the safe withdrawal rate was 2.4%.

The 4% rule's assumption of a constant real dollar withdrawal during retirement may be unrealistically high. Studies have shown that real spending tends to decline through retirement.

Within the FIRE movement, the 4% rule is a commonly used tool, but those planning on retirements longer than 30 years may need to plan on withdrawal rates closer to 3%.

Modern scholarly work on retirement spend down strategies focuses more on variable-withdrawal-rate due to these issues.

== Revisions ==
While the rule is popularly known as the "4% rule", Bengen has said that was a simplification of the paper's hypothetical 4.15% withdrawal rate. In 2025, Bengen published the book A Richer Retirement: Supercharging the 4% Rule to Spend More and Enjoy More where he diversified his suggested portfolio allocation and increased the safe withdrawal rate to 4.7%.
