= Wax Mannequin =

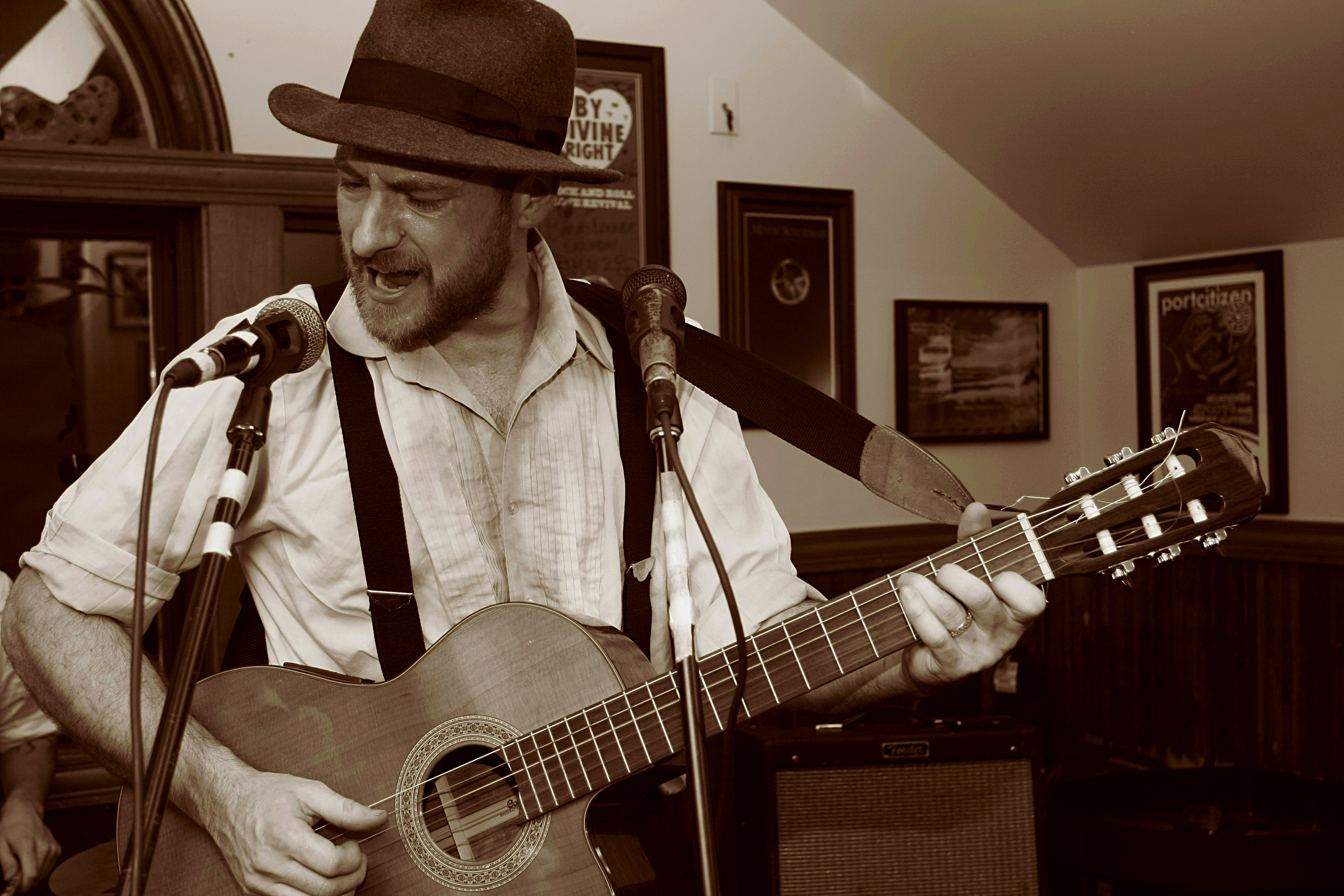
- Wax Mannequin, November 2009

Background information
- Born: Chris Adeney
- Origin: Hamilton, Ontario
- Genres: musician, songwriter
- Instruments: Singing, guitar
- Years active: 2000–current
- Labels: Coqi, Zunior, Infinite Heat, Coax
- Website: http://waxmannequin.com

Wax Mannequin is the stage name of Chris Adeney, a Canadian indie rock singer-songwriter. His style has been described as "a hybrid of Bruce Cockburn and Frank Zappa", "Tom Waits and Type O Negative jamming on the early Beatles catalogue", and "Rheostatics via Savatage". Carl Wilson of The Globe and Mail noted that "crowds are often baffled whether to be awed, irritated or amused by Wax's all-rockets-flaring, un-Canadian-like extravagant performances" (2004).

Part of the Hamilton, Ontario scene, Adeney released his first self-titled album, a solo album in the psychedelic folk genre, in 2000. He followed up with and Gun in 2002, before putting together an eponymous band for his third release, 2004's The Price, which was supported by national tours across Canada and Australia. His best known single to date is "Message from the Queen".

His fourth album, Orchard and Ire, was released in 2007 (an EP titled Orchard was released in summer 2006).

His fifth full-length album, Saxon, was released by Zunior on 4 August 2009. It was the first of Wax Mannequin's albums to prominently identify his backing band, Black Blood (Aidan Campbell on percussion and Mark Raymond on bass), and was followed by extensive cross-Canada and European touring.

He is the brother of financial blogger Mr. Money Mustache.

== Discography ==
- Wax Mannequin (later reworked as "Uni") (2000)
- and Gun (2002)
- The Price (2004)
- Orchard EP (2006)
- Orchard and Ire (2007)
- Saxon (2009)
- No Safe Home (2012)
- Have a New Name (2018)
- The Red Brain (2023)
