= Pre-tirement =

Neologism

Pre-tirement is a neologism for the working state between traditional employment and full retirement that is common among aging populations in first world economies. Pre-tirees work on a part-time or informal basis for reasons that vary and may be to earn money, escape boredom, or contribute to efforts they consider important.

The word is a portmanteau word, coming from the prefix "pre" and the word "retirement." The state is being found primarily in first world economies, with aging populations. A "pre-tiree" will continue to create economic wealth and/or contribute to the generation of knowledge, likely on a part-time or reduced hours basis. Some "pre-tirees" use the period to give back by providing unpaid social support. This form of unpaid work creates economic benefit, by allowing taxes to be focused on other wealth creating or protecting activities but relies on the existence of sufficient financial resource.

== Usage ==
- Used in a book title by Kris Miller (2012), though her usage describes planning for retirement, rather than an emerging state of employment.
- The ACAS website referred the important shift in retirement norms observed in the Zopa Report: "many people are choosing to ease into retirement in a 'phased or gradual process'.
- Use of the neologism in news publications peaked after the publication of the Zopa Report.
