= Longevity insurance =

Type of annuity contract

Longevity insurance, describes the process of mitigating longevity risk. In the United States, such risk mitigation is often achieved using a longevity annuity or Tontine, qualifying longevity annuity contract (QLAC), deferred income annuity, an annuity contract designed to provide a regular income for life starting at a pre-established future age, e.g. 85, and purchased many years before reaching that age.

== Longevity risk ==
A longevity risk is any potential risk attached to the increasing life expectancy of pensioners and policy holders, which can eventually result in higher pay-out ratios than expected for many pension funds and insurance companies.

One important risk to individuals who are spending down savings is that they will live longer than expected, and thus exhaust their savings, dying in poverty or burdening relatives. This is also referred to as "outliving one's savings" or "outliving one's assets".

Individuals often underestimate longevity risk. In the United States, most retirees do not expect to live past 85, but this is in fact the median conditional life expectancy for men at 65 (half of 65-year-old men will live to 85 or older, and more women will).

== General description of longevity insurance in the United States ==
Longevity annuities are like "reverse life insurance", meaning premium dollars are collected by the life insurance company by its policy holders to pay income when a policy holder lives a long life, instead of collecting premium dollars and paying a death claim on a policy holder's short life in ordinary life insurance. Longevity annuities use mortality credits to pool money and pay out the remaining policy holders' claims, this being living a long life.

The term "longevity insurance" comes from this type of annuity being insurance against unusually long life. It may seem odd to insure against an event that most people would welcome. However, living a very long time would strain many people's financial resources, just as a fire which destroys their house would strain many people's finances if they didn't have fire insurance. The logic that makes fire insurance a prevalent means for coping with the financial risk of house fires would seem to argue for greater use of longevity insurance for retirement planning: Few people will live to a very old age, so it doesn't make sense for everyone to try to cover that possibility with savings and investments. (The same type of reasoning applies to house insurance: because few people will experience house fires, therefore it is not realistic to expect everyone to save and invest specifically for purposes of house replacement.) Longevity insurance is not designed for the early retirement years, so it is not intended as a complete retirement plan by itself.

Summer of 2014, the IRS and Treasury Department finalized the creation of qualifying longevity annuity contracts, or QLACs, under the required minimum distribution (RMD) rules of Internal Revenue Code section 401(a)(9). Providing an exception to the RMD rules allowing an IRA owner to use the lesser of 25% of account owners total IRA account balance or $125,000 to deferred income annuity or longevity annuity that provides no cash value and promises income payments no later than age 85. This amount was subject to inflation adjustment in the coming years. Starting in January 2018 the QLAC limit was raised to $130,000.

For example, a person might pay $20,000 from their retirement savings at age 60 to purchase longevity insurance that would pay $11,803 per year starting at age 85 and continuing until death. These numbers are made up, but are based on actual terms offered by at least one major insurance company in February 2019. Thus, in this example, if the person lived to 95, they would receive $118,030 on their $20,000 investment (10 years at $11,803/year). This is a rate of return that far exceeds that available at prevailing interest rates on government bonds. The economic reason for the high return at low risk is that one is giving up any claim on that initial $20,000 investment on behalf of one's heirs. If the person dies before 85, the insurance company pays nothing to them or their estate. (Some companies offer optional features that would modify this, so there would be a death benefit or so they would have the option of starting payments sooner, but taking these options would substantially reduce the annual income the policy would pay at age 85.)

The benefit is generally paid in the form of a guaranteed income stream for the remainder of the individual's life (as in the above example), though alternative benefit forms may be provided depending on the terms of the actual policy.

The main use of these products is to provide retirees with a way to stretch their retirement resources to cover the possibility of living to a very old age. The likelihood that many buyers of such an annuity will not live to collect on it allows the insurance company to pay relatively high returns, higher than are available on low-risk investments, to the fraction of buyers who do live that long, i.e., mortality credits.
