= African Slum Journal =

Local journalism project in Kenya

African Slum Journal is a biweekly video episode about the informal settlements of Nairobi, Kenya.

The short documentaries show the slum residents and their daily lives. They are often unemployed, live without electricity and clean water. Insecurity is high. Sanitation and food security is a daily struggle.

In the videos the slum residents also show their resilience and their creativity. The informal economy creates jobs, such as recycling trash goods to provide food, housing and education for themselves and their families.

The young reporters who make the video journals live in the slums and have their own media house, called Nairobi Community Media House. Their bottom up journalism captures the views of slum residents from inside.
