= William Bengen =

American finance and investment writer (born 1947)

William P. Bengen
- Occupation: Financial planner
- Known for: The "4% rule" for retirement withdrawals

William P. Bengen is a retired financial adviser who first articulated the 4% withdrawal rate ("four percent rule") as a rule of thumb for withdrawal rates from retirement savings; it is eponymously known as the "Bengen rule". The rule was later further popularized by the Trinity study (1998), based on the same data and similar analysis. Bengen later called this rate the SAFEMAX rate, for "the maximum 'safe' historical withdrawal rate", and later revised it to 4.5% if tax-free and 4.1% for taxable. In low-inflation economic environments the rate may even be higher.

== Withdrawal rate ==
Bengen conducted a number of empirical simulations of historical market behavior and concluded that a person could "draw down", withdraw, up to 4 percent annually from their portfolio without fear of outliving their money. He published his research in the October 1994 issue of the Journal of Financial Planning. He is also the author of the book Conserving Client Portfolios During Retirement, where he revised and updated his analysis. He gave a brief update in Bengen (2012). Bengen later stated the 4% guideline was intended as a "worst case scenario" for retirees in United States, using a hypothetical example of someone who retired in 1968 at a stock market peak before a protracted recession and high inflation through the 1970s. In that scenario, a 4% withdrawal rate allowed the investor's funds to last 30 years. Historically, Bengen says closer to 7% is an average safe withdrawal rate and at other times withdrawal rates up to 13% have been feasible.

The withdrawal rate has since become a staple of the financial service industry, adopted by several major financial firms.

== Career ==
=== Early life and education ===
A native of Brooklyn, born in 1947, (Note: Turned 66 in 2013 October.) Bengen received a B.S. from MIT in aeronautics and astronautics. He is a co-author of Topics in Advanced Model Rocketry, originally published by the MIT Press in 1973. He worked for 17 years with his family-owned soft-drink-bottling franchise firm in the New York metropolitan area, during which he served tenure as president and COO; the company was sold in 1987.

=== Financial career ===
Following the sale of the family business, Bengen moved to Southern California and began a Certified Financial Planner practice, Bengen Financial Services, earning his certification in 1990 and his master's degree in financial planning in 1993. He ran the firm as a fee-only (no commission) practice for twenty years, then sold the firm and retired in 2013.

== The Four Percent Drawdown rule ==
Based on his early research of actual stock returns and retirement scenarios over the past 75 years, Bengen found that retirees who draw down no more than 4.2 percent of their portfolio in the initial year, and adjust that amount every subsequent year for inflation, stand a great chance that their money will outlive them.

The 4% Rule is sometimes also called the Rule of 300.

Criticism of the 4% withdrawal rule include references to its assumption of one's investment portfolio, the differences in historical and current interest rates, as well as the reality that most people's spending habits are not consistently linear.

Bengen later updated his findings based on further research to suggest 4.7 percent as the safe withdrawal rate in one's first year of retirement.
