= Frugality =

Being frugal in the consumption of consumable resources

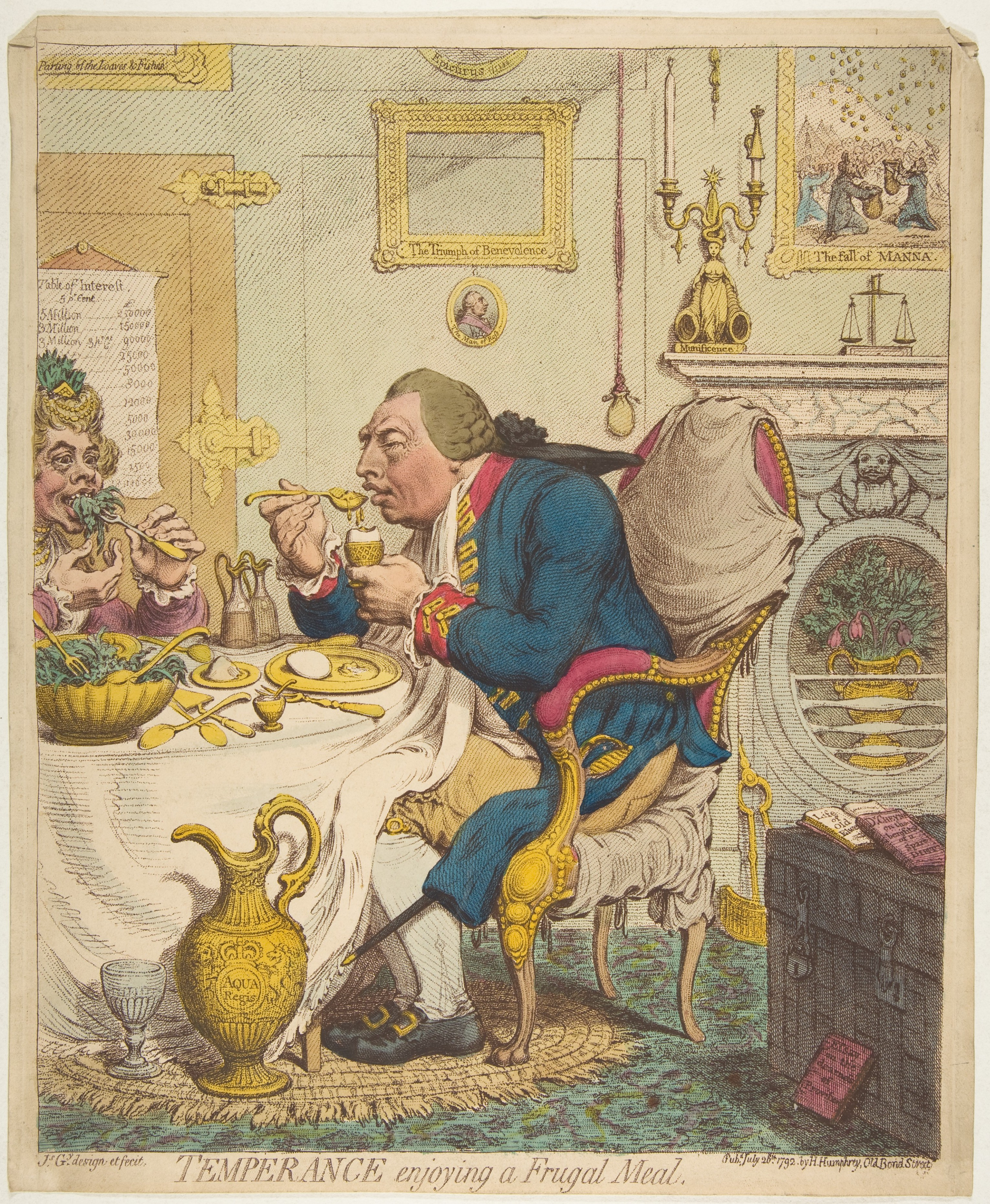
James Gillray's satirical print Temperance Enjoying a Frugal Meal. George III is depicted with patched breeches and a chair covered with protective fabric, eating a simple boiled egg and using the tablecloth as his napkin. Winter flowers fill the unlit fireplace.

Frugality is the quality of being frugal, sparing, thrifty, prudent, or economical in the consumption of resources, whether they be food, time, or money. It involves the avoidance of waste, extravagance, and lavishness.

In behavioral science, frugality has been defined as the tendency to acquire goods and services in a restrained manner, and resourceful use of already-owned economic goods and services, to achieve a longer term goal.

== Strategies ==
Common techniques of frugality include reduction of waste, curbing costly habits, suppressing instant gratification by means of fiscal self-restraint, seeking efficiency, avoiding traps, defying expensive social norms, detecting and avoiding manipulative advertising, embracing cost-free options, using barter, and staying well-informed about local circumstances and both market and product/service realities.

Frugality may contribute to health by leading people to avoid products that are both expensive and unhealthy when used to excess. Frugal living is practiced by those who aim to cut expenses, have more money, and get the most they possibly can from their money.

== US history ==
American Colonial Period (17th and 18th centuries): Frugality was intertwined with moral and religious values among the population of Puritan and Quaker settlers in American society. They emphasized the virtues of productive work for the benefit of society and frowned upon unnecessary consumption. Laws were enacted in colonies like Massachusetts and Pennsylvania to regulate extravagant spending, reflecting the religious belief that individuals should not indulge in luxurious living. The Great Awakening religious revival of the 1730s emphasized the virtues of simple living, and further reinforced the importance of frugality. A shift towards consumerism began to emerge as the century progressed. Colonists began acquiring imported luxury goods and amassing debts with the British.

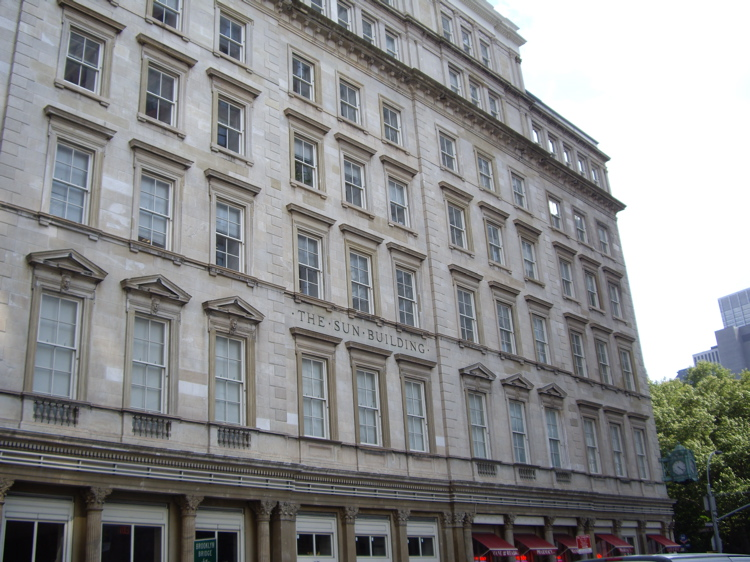
280 Broadway, the first department store in the United States

Antebellum Period (early 19th century): The United States experienced significant economic growth and social change during the Antebellum Period, which influenced frugality discourses in various ways. Middle-class women played an increasingly active role in making household purchases. Figures like Lyman Beecher preached the conservative and moralistic messages of Christian simplicity which mirrored Puritan ideals of frugality. Concerns about materialism undermining social order were widespread including ministers' sermon's warnings against luxury and excess. Retailers like Alexander Turney Stewart experimented with the concept of department stores and larger-scale merchandising formats began to emerge. Consumer culture started growing as distribution methods improved and advertising became more advanced. The Antebellum Period was a transitional phase in American consumer culture, where traditional values of frugality coexisted with consumerism.

During the Gilded Age (in the late 19th century), a notable critique emerged of excessive consumption and the glaring wealth disparity prevalent in society. In the Gilded Age, characterized by industrialization and urbanization, consumer culture flourished with aggressive advertising and the feminization of shopping spaces. Thorstein Veblen's critique in "Theory of the Leisure Class" highlighted conspicuous consumption as a means of social distinction, while authors like Edith Wharton and Charles Wagner advocated for a simplified life amidst growing materialism. John Wanamaker's embrace of simplicity, despite his wealth, exemplified the paradox of promoting frugality while profiting from consumerism in ornate department stores.

During World War I, the ethos of conservation and thrift gained further traction (Hauerwas, "War and the American Difference: Theological Reflections on Violence and National Identity"). Governments and organizations promoted these values as essential for supporting the war effort and ensuring resources were allocated efficiently. Citizens were encouraged to practice frugality through rationing programs and voluntary austerity measures to conserve supplies for troops abroad. In the early 20th century, frugality gained prominence in the U.S., spurred by events like World War I and the Great Depression. Figures like Stuart Chase promoted thrift as a patriotic duty, leading to the National Thrift Movement. The 1930s saw a populist backlash against excess, with media and advertising promoting controlled consumption amid economic hardship. Despite fears of consumerism's collapse, ingrained habits persisted, reflecting the enduring tension between aspiration and austerity in American society.

During World War II (September 1, 1939 – September 2, 1945), the United States government launched poster campaigns which promoted frugality to American consumers, which included advocations for thrifty behavior, recycling, adherence to price controls and rationing laws, and more. Posters promoted conservation efforts such as saving gasoline and automobile tires and encouraged Americans to recycle materials such as tin cans and waste fats for ammunition and explosives. Commercial advertising at this time also incorporated frugality appeals. Companies such as Texaco, the American Gas Association, and the Bell Telephone System encouraged responsible consumption and energy-saving behavior. Newspapers, magazines, and private companies were also promoting frugal consumption, encouraging Americans to practice behaviors to conserve food such as meal planning and home canning. As a result of the promotion of conservation efforts, Americans responded by recycling 538 million pounds of waste fats, 23 million tons of paper, 800 million pounds of tin, and planting 50 million victory gardens. Due to increased military spending, consumers faced shortages and restrictions on goods as a result of resource redirection for raw materials and production. Frugality became a major topic in public discourse during this period of time. Most Americans accepted the limitations placed on private consumption during World War II. Following the war, there was a rapid transition from frugal consumption to consumerism as a result of economic barriers disappearing, leading to economic expansion.

Late 20th century (1970s): The rapid change of technology during this time changed the way consumerism was perceived. With the emergence of new products the realm of luxury items changed from handbags and luxury cars to electronics, computers, the internet and social media. Consumers began to reimagine society through an natural environment lens when the National Science and Technology Policy Organization and Priorities Act of 1976 was passed, it pushed for the frugal use of resources for the future development of technologies. Consumers changed the way they searched for products by implementing the concept of savings and loan association, known as thrifting. Through this expression environmental movements were able to gain momentum. The economic shift from mainstream items to thrifting gave consumers a place to separate from the pressure of social stratification. The thrift industry during the late 20th century emphasized the need of systemic savings and mutual savings across social classes. In 1987 the concept of thrifting began to slowly decline as the consumer market began too slowly evolve with the creation of new technologies. Frugality within the American society declined as a result, with the concepts of energy frugal and material frugalness being the only to be adapted into society. The reshaping of consumerism was driven by the advancement of technology.

== Philosophy ==
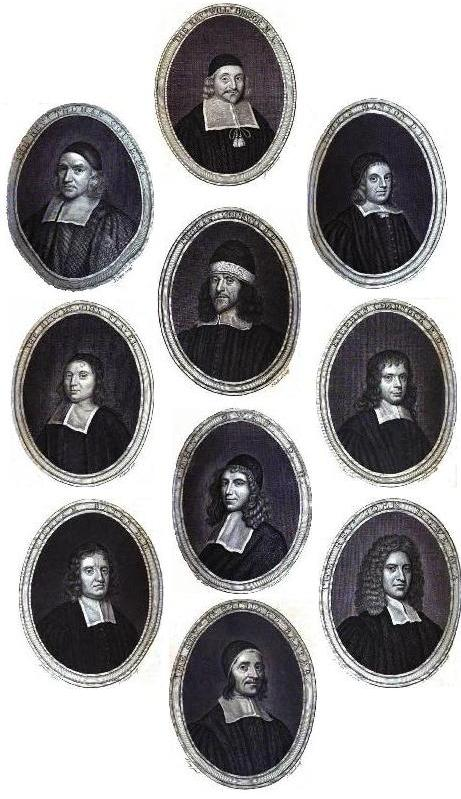
Gallery of famous 17th-century Puritan theologians: Thomas Gouge, William Bridge, Thomas Manton, John Flavel, Richard Sibbes, Stephen Charnock, William Bates, John Owen, John Howe and Richard Baxter

In the context of some belief systems, frugality is a philosophy in which one does not trust (or is deeply wary of) "expert" knowledge from commercial markets or corporate cultures, claiming to know what is in the best economic, material, or spiritual interests of the individual.

Different spiritual communities consider frugality to be a virtue or a spiritual discipline. The Religious Society of Friends and the Puritans are examples of such groups. The philosophy behind this is that people ought to save money to allocate it to more charitable purposes, such as helping others in need.

Benjamin Franklin paired frugality with industry as the key virtues for financial security: "[W]aste neither time nor money, but make the best use of both. Without industry and frugality nothing will do, and with them everything." Cicero agreed, arguing that "men don't understand how great a revenue sparingness is."

There are also environmentalists who consider frugality to be a virtue through which humans can make use of their ancestral skills as hunter-gatherers, carrying little and needing little, and finding meaning in nature instead of man-made conventions or religion. Henry David Thoreau expressed a similar philosophy in Walden, with his zest for self-reliance and minimal possessions while living simply in the woods. Degrowth movement advocates use the term "frugal abundance" to denote the enjoyment of a simple, yet culturally, emotionally and spiritually rich, life through which one's necessities are achieved through collective sufficiency respecting the Earth's limits.

== See also ==
- Anti-consumerism – Sociopolitical ideology
- Capsule wardrobe – Collection of clothing items that do not go out of fashion
- Conspicuous consumption – Concept in sociology and economy
- Ethical consumerism – Type of consumer activism
- Extreme Cheapskates – American reality television series
- Financial independence – Accumulation of sufficient resources to not need employment
- FIRE movement – Movement whose goal is financial independence and retiring early
- Frugal engineering – Process of reducing the complexity and cost of a good and its production
- Garbage picking – Taking items from waste piles for personal use
- Intentional living – Lifestyle
- Miser – Person who is reluctant to spend
- Mottainai – Japanese term translates as "What a waste!"
- Overconsumption – Resource use exceeding carrying capacity
- Paradox of thrift – Paradox in economics
- Price comparison service – Vertical search engine
- Simple living – Simplified, minimalistic lifestyle
- Sustainable living – Lifestyle
