= Texas Property and Casualty Insurance Guaranty Association =

Insurance guarantee association in Texas

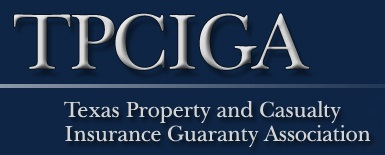
- Formation: 1971
- Founder: 62nd Texas Legislature
- Headquarters: 8911 North Capital of Texas Hwy, Bldg 2, Suite 2200; Austin, TX 78759
- Website: tpciga.org

The Texas Property and Casualty Insurance Guaranty Association (TPCIGA) is the state-designated insurance guaranty association for property insurance and casualty insurance claims in Texas, United States. It is headquartered in Austin.

== History ==
The TPCIGA was formed by the 62nd Texas Legislature.

== Purpose and scope ==
We are an insurance safety net and partner in the insolvency system, fairly serving the people of Texas in an efficient and cost-effective way.

— TPCIGA, Mission statement

According to the Texas State Auditor's Office, the "Association's purpose is to pay, fairly and in a timely manner, valid insurance claims involving insolvent property and casualty insurance companies, according to Texas laws".

TPCIGA's designation includes commercial property insurance, home insurance, liability insurance, renters' insurance, vehicle insurance, and workers' compensation.
