= Financial independence =

Accumulation of sufficient resources to not need employment

Financial independence is a state in which an individual or household has accumulated sufficient financial resources to cover its cost-of-living expenses without depending on active employment to earn money to maintain its current lifestyle. These financial resources can take the form of investments or personal-use assets, passive income, side-jobs income, inheritance, pension, retirement income, and other sources.

Gaining financial independence should not be confused with not doing any work. Financial independence describes the freedom to make individual choices, including pursuing passions.

Researchers posit that childhood experiences with money play a pivotal role in shaping values, attitudes, and financial behavior. Financial independence is a subjective concept and can be interpreted differently by different individuals. Some people practice frugal living and save and invest a large percentage of their income to achieve financial independence early in their career, as shown by people following the "financial independence retire early (FIRE)" movement, while others pursue traditional old-age retirement. Financial independence can be a modest lifestyle or one with a higher standard of living.

== Theoretical frameworks and factors influencing financial independence ==
Researchers have developed several theories to explain how financial behavior is influenced by values, attitudes, and biases. Parents may knowingly or unknowingly influence their children's relationship with money. These theories offer insights into how an individual or family members think and feel about money, stages of development to embrace a change, ability to resolve money conflicts, and overcoming unexamined cognitive and emotional biases to build a healthy relationship with money. These factors can have major implications on an individual's or family's ability to achieve financial independence.

Researchers have tested several methods of family financial socialization to study how young adults remember their parents teaching them about money when they were growing up and if it contributed in any way to their financial well-being and helped in achieving financial independence. In case of young adults, attaining college education, having an income, owning assets, having basic money management and problem solving skills improved their ability to achieve financial independence. Identity Capital Theory suggests that young adults grow up with the ability to manage money if they have access to physical resources like money knowledge and social connections, and are also able to take responsibility for their actions and able to make their own decisions. These resources help individuals become financially independent later in life.

=== Psychological perspectives ===
One of the eight concepts of Bowen's family systems theory is the concept of triangles. An elderly couple with an insurmountable amount of debt, who are not on the same page to pay off the debt, may seek help from their child and involve them in resolving the conflict. The resultant imbalance in the system, where three people each have different opinions, can further lead to unresolved issues and derail the retirement plan of the child. The family projection process explains how children can end up with emotional issues by being witness to their parents' toxic relationship. Financial socialization theory and communication privacy management theory sheds light on how the feelings and attitudes about money developed and influenced by the family members in early childhood can result in marital conflicts later in life.

=== Behavioral finance perspectives ===
The Behavior Portfolio Theory governs that investors are "normal" and cannot always make rational decisions due to their cognitive and emotional biases. The field of behavioral finance defines several biases and heuristics that offer insight into individual behavior and how these biases influence an individual's investment decisions.

Prospect theory posits that individuals value gains and losses differently; the pain of experiencing a loss of $1,000 is more intense than the joy of gaining $1,000. Investors also tend to get carried away with recent information, leading to recency bias. An investor may hold onto a losing stock for long periods hoping it will increase in value in the future, indicating that an investor is loss averse. An investor may mimic trades of other investors in hopes of making a huge profit, showing signs of herd mentality. Hindsight bias, confirmation bias, anchoring, familiarity bias, endowment effect, similarity heuristics, affect heuristic are examples of other biases and heuristics.

A couple may benefit from working with a financial therapist to resolve deeply rooted issues and feelings about money. A financial planner can help create a financial plan and increase awareness on the benefits of goal setting, budgeting, investing, diversification to help an individual or family stay the course to achieve financial independence.

== Sources of income to achieve financial independence ==
Income can be classified into multiple categories. In the United States, there are three sources of income; active, portfolio, and passive. The classification may vary by country. Wages, salaries, material participation in trade or business constitutes active income. Portfolio income includes interest, dividends, royalties, annuities, capital gains. Generally, income from rental activities, and activities where an individual does not materially participate are considered passive source of income. An individual can tap into multiple sources of income to satisfy their income needs and maintain desired lifestyle after achieving financial independence.

The following is a non-exhaustive list of sources of income.

- Bank fixed deposits and monthly income schemes
- Business ownership (if the business does not require active operation)
- Dividends from stocks, bonds and income trusts
- Interest earned from deposit accounts, money market accounts or loans
- Life annuity
- Notes, including stocks and bonds
- Oil leases
- Patent licensing
- Pensions
- Rental property
- Royalty from creative works, e.g. photographs, books, patents, music, etc.
- Trust deed (real estate)

== Approaches to financial independence ==
William Bengen conducted research to determine safe withdrawal rates from the portfolio and concluded that an individual can safely withdraw 4% of their portfolio savings in the first year of retirement and can adjust the withdrawal rate by rate of inflation in subsequent years. If an individual can cover their annual expenses by withdrawing 4% of their portfolio savings, the individual is assumed to have achieved financial independence.

Suppose a person can generate enough income to meet their needs from sources other than their primary occupation. In that case, they have achieved financial independence, regardless of age, existing wealth, or current salary. For example, if a 25-year-old has $1000 in monthly expenses, and assets that generate $1000 or more per month, they have achieved financial independence. On the other hand, if a 50-year-old has assets that generate $1,000,000 a month but has expenses that equal more than that per month, they are not financially independent, as they still have to earn the difference each month to make all their payments. However, the effects of inflation must be considered. If a person needs $100/month for living expenses today, they will need $105/month next year and $110.25/month the following year to support the same lifestyle, assuming a 5% annual inflation rate. A person's assets and liabilities are important in determining if they have achieved financial independence. An asset is anything of value that a person owns, whereas a liability is what the person owes. Increasing savings, reducing expenses, consistently investing with a long-term horizon, and having a well-diversified portfolio can help achieve financial independence.

== See also ==
- FIRE movement
- Economic security
- Wage slavery
