= Executive Life Insurance Company =

Defunct American insurance company

- Industry: Insurance
- Headquarters: California
- Key people: Fred Carr; Mike Milken; Robert Sobel
- Subsidiaries: Executive Life Insurance Company of New York

Executive Life Insurance Company (ELIC) was once the largest life insurance company in California. Its financial problems and subsequent insolvency in April 1991 shocked its policyholders and the financial world.

At the time, First Executive was the biggest insurer ever to fail, which resulted primarily from money-losing investments in junk bonds. First Executive through Fred Carr had a strong association with Mike Milken and the brokerage firm Drexel Burnham Lambert, whereby at the end of 1990 the company-owned high-yield debt, much of it issued through Drexel, with a carrying value of $9 billion. According to Robert Sobel, First Executive was involved in 90% of Drexel's underwritings, which accounted for about $40 billion in bonds from 1982 to 1987.

After the State of California took over Executive Life, it sold the company's junk-bond portfolio to Altus Finance, a unit of Crédit Lyonnais, in November 1991 for $3.25 billion. Because banks were prohibited under the Glass–Steagall Act from owning insurance companies, Crédit Lyonnais organized an investor group to buy the insurance company operations, with the new company named Aurora National Life Assurance Co. Majority control of Aurora National was sold to Groupe Artémis in 1994. In July 1998, an anonymous French whistle-blower told the California Insurance Department that Crédit Lyonnais was the real buyer of the insurance company and controlled it through secret agreements. In early 1999, the California Insurance Department sued the bank and other parties, alleging fraud and seeking $2 billion in restitution.

In 2003, Crédit Lyonnais and others agreed to pay $771 million in settlements resulting from false statements to bank regulators in connection with the acquisition of junk bonds and the insurance business of the failed Executive Life Insurance Company of California.

In 2001, Swiss Re took control of the Aurora National Life policies; Swiss Re fully acquired Aurora National Life in 2012. In 2014, Aurora National Life was sold to Reinsurance Group of America.

A subsidiary, Executive Life Insurance Company of New York (ELNY), was seized by the state of New York, who sold the majority of the business to MetLife, retaining the structured settlement book of business. Due to mismanagement, ELNY was ordered to liquidate. Guaranty Association Benefits Company took over the assets of ELNY in 2013.

== See also ==
- Guaranty association
