= National Organization of Life and Health Insurance Guaranty Associations =

The National Organization of Life and Health Insurance Guaranty Associations (often abbreviated NOLHGA) is a voluntary, U.S. association made up of the life and health insurance guaranty associations of all 50 states and the District of Columbia. NOLHGA was founded in 1983 to coordinate the efforts of state guaranty associations to provide protection to policyholders when their multi-state life or health insurance company becomes insolvent. The organization is based in Herndon, Virginia.

== Mechanism ==
When an insurance company reports to its state insurance regulator that it is in financial trouble, the state will first attempt to assist the company back toward financial stability. If the state insurance department determines the company cannot be saved, then the insurance commissioner asks the state court to order the liquidation of the company. Once the order to liquidate a company that operates in multiple states is handed down, NOLHGA, on behalf of affected member state guaranty associations, assembles a task force of affected guaranty associations to analyze the company’s commitments to policyholders. Each affected state guaranty association pays out claims to the insurance company's policyholders in the state; in some instances, the associations arrange for policies to be transferred to a financially sound insurer. Each state guaranty association is governed by state law; most associations cover up to at least $300,000 for life insurance death benefits, $100,000 in cash surrender value for life insurance, $250,000 in withdrawal and cash values for annuities, and up to $500,000 in health insurance policy benefits (depending on the type of health insurance in question).

== Structure ==
The National Organization of Life and Health Insurance Guaranty Associations has four main departments: administrative services, communications, insurance services, and legal.

=== Administrative ===
The Administrative Services Department supports NOLHGA by providing services such as human resources, accounting, membership records, and general facilities management. The department also plans and coordinates the Annual Meeting and provides support services to other departments and to the NOLHGA Board of Directors.

=== Communications ===
The Communications Department develops the organization's outreach efforts to its members, state insurance departments, receivers, insurance companies, and the media. In addition, the department provides communications assistance to individual state guaranty associations, the NOLHGA Board of Directors, and handles all media and public information inquiries.

=== Insurance ===
The Insurance Services Department coordinates all insolvency task force activities, including meetings and negotiations with receivers and assumption reinsurance companies concerning life and health insurers in rehabilitation or liquidation. This can include securing and managing legal, actuarial, and/or administrative services; seeking bids and evaluating the financial soundness of potential reinsurers; and determining the most cost-effective and efficient manner to continue policyholders’ coverage. Insurance Services also provides financial information on insolvencies to NOLHGA members.

=== Legal ===
The Legal Department provides legal counsel to insolvency task forces, committees, and the NOLHGA Board of Directors. The department collects and distributes legal information to member state guaranty associations and serves as an information resource for case laws. The department also coordinates the efforts of NOLHGA’s Legal Committee, which addresses issues pertaining to the insolvency process and develops strategies for related lawsuits.
