= Guaranty association =

Guaranty associations are organizations which guarantee insurance policies in the event of an insolvency event.

== History ==
All 50 states, Puerto Rico, the United States Virgin Islands (property/casualty only) and the District of Columbia have a guaranty mechanism in place for the payment of covered claims arising from the insolvency of insurers licensed in their state. Before the creation of guaranty associations, a typical claimant could have waited for years for payment of a claim and then still receive only a fraction of what was due under the terms of the policy or contract. Guaranty associations, subject to statutory limitations, were created to alleviate these problems and ensure the stability of the insurance market.

— NAIC, policy briefing

Guaranty associations were created to aid consumers in the event of an insurance company becoming insolvent during the claims process.

== Funding ==
In general, guaranty associations are funded by a small portion of insurers' profits.

== Collectives and associations ==
The National Organization of Life and Health Insurance Guaranty Associations coordinates multi-state guaranty efforts in the United States.

== Legislation ==
The National Association of Insurance Commissioners has proposed the State Life and Health Insurance Guaranty Association Act.

== Annuities ==
Major insolvencies have occurred at least 62 times since the conspicuous collapse of the Executive Life Insurance Company in 1991.

Annuity contracts are protected against insurance company insolvency up to a specific dollar limit, often $100,000, but as high as $500,000 in New York, New Jersey, and the state of Washington. California is the only state that has a limit less than 100%; the limit is 80% up to $300,000. This protection is not insurance. When an insolvency occurs, the guaranty association steps in to protect annuity holders, and decides what to do on a case-by-case basis. Sometimes the contracts will be taken over and fulfilled by a solvent insurance company.

A state guaranty association is not a government agency, but states usually require insurance companies to belong to it as a condition of being licensed to do business. The guaranty associations of the fifty states are members of a national umbrella association, the National Organization of Life and Health Insurance Guaranty Associations (NOLHGA).

A difference between guaranty association protection and the protection e.g. of bank accounts by FDIC, credit union accounts by NCUA, and brokerage accounts by SIPC, is that it is difficult for consumers to learn about this protection. Usually, state law prohibits insurance agents and companies from using the guaranty association in any advertising and agents are prohibited by statute from using this Web site or the existence of the guaranty association as an inducement to purchase insurance. Presumably this is a response to concerns by stronger insurance companies about moral hazard.

== By location ==
=== United States ===
There is at least one guaranty association in all 50 states as of 2015. Many states have multiple guaranty associations, each specific to the type of insurance covered.

==== California ====
The California Insurance Guarantee Association and California Life & Health Insurance Guarantee Association serves the state of California.

==== Florida ====
In Florida, the guaranty associations are the Florida Insurance Guaranty Association, Florida Health Maintenance Organization Consumer Assistance Plan, Florida Life and Health Insurance Guaranty Association, and Florida Workers' Compensation Insurance Guaranty Association.

==== Michigan ====
The Michigan Life & Health Insurance Guaranty Association (MLHIGA) is a nonprofit association of life and health insurance companies authorized to write life insurance, annuities or health insurance in the state of Michigan.

==== Texas ====
The state designated guaranty associations in Texas are the Texas Property and Casualty Insurance Guaranty Association, Texas Certified Self-Insurer Guaranty Association, Texas Life and Health Insurance Guaranty Association, Texas Self-Insurance Group Guaranty Fund, and the Texas Title Insurance Guaranty Association.
