= Trinity study =

1998 paper regarding withdrawal from retirement accounts

In finance, investment advising, and retirement planning, the Trinity study is an informal name used to refer to an influential 1998 paper by three professors of finance at Trinity University in the US. It is one of a category of studies that attempt to determine "safe withdrawal rates" from retirement portfolios that contain stocks and thus grow (or shrink) irregularly over time.

In the original study success was primarily judged by whether portfolio lasted for the desired payout period, i.e., the investor did not run out of money during their retirement years before dying; capital preservation was not a primary goal, but the "terminal value" of portfolios was considered for those investors who may wish to leave bequests.

== Study and conclusions ==
"The 4% Rule" refers to one of the scenarios examined by the authors. The context is one of annual withdrawals from a retirement portfolio containing a mix of stocks and bonds. The 4% refers to the portion of the portfolio withdrawn during the first year; it is assumed that the portion withdrawn in subsequent years will increase with the consumer price index (CPI) to keep pace with the cost of living. The withdrawals may exceed the income earned by the portfolio, and the total value of the portfolio may well shrink during periods when the stock market performs poorly. It is assumed that the portfolio needs to last thirty years. The withdrawal regime is deemed to have failed if the portfolio is exhausted in less than thirty years and to have succeeded if there are unspent assets at the end of the period.

The authors backtested a number of stock/bond mixes and withdrawal rates against market data compiled by Ibbotson Associates covering the period from 1925 to 1995. They examined payout periods from 15 to 30 years, and withdrawals that stayed level or increased with inflation. For level payouts, they stated that "If history is any guide for the future, then withdrawal rates of 3% and 4% are extremely unlikely to exhaust any portfolio of stocks and bonds during any of the payout periods shown in Table 1. In those cases, portfolio success seems close to being assured." For payouts increasing to keep pace with inflation, they stated that "withdrawal rates of 3% to 4% continue to produce high portfolio success rates for stock-dominated portfolios."

The authors make this qualification:

The word planning is emphasized because of the great uncertainties in the stock and bond markets. Mid-course corrections likely will be required, with the actual dollar amounts withdrawn adjusted downward or upward relative to the plan. The investor needs to keep in mind that selection of a withdrawal rate is not a matter of contract but rather a matter of planning.

Attempts have been made to study the effects of asset valuations on safe withdrawal rates and update the 4% rule and Trinity Study for longer retirements.

== Other studies, impact and criticisms ==
Other authors have made similar studies using backtested and simulated market data, and other withdrawal systems and strategies.

The Trinity study and others of its kind have been sharply criticized, e.g., by Scott et al. (2008), not on their data or conclusions, but on what they see as an irrational and economically inefficient withdrawal strategy: "This rule and its variants finance a constant, non-volatile spending plan using a risky, volatile investment strategy. As a result, retirees accumulate unspent surpluses when markets outperform and face spending shortfalls when markets underperform."

Laurence Kotlikoff, advocate of the consumption smoothing theory of retirement planning, is even less kind to the 4% rule, saying that it "has no connection to economics.... economic theory says you need to adjust your spending based on the portfolio of assets you're holding. If you invest aggressively, you need to spend defensively. Notice that the 4 percent rule has no connection to the other rule—to target 85 percent of your preretirement income. The whole thing is made up out of the blue."

The original Trinity study was based on data through 1995. An update of their results using data through 2009 is provided in Pfau (2010). Shortly afterwards, the original authors of the Trinity Study published an updated study, also using data through 2009.

The procedure for determining a safe withdrawal rate from a retirement portfolio in these studies considers only the uncertainty arising from the future returns to be earned on the investment. Another major uncertainty is the amount of spending that will be required each period to provide a given standard of living. For instance, there is a small chance each period of an emergency arising that will require a large extra withdrawal that may be comparable in size to the loss from a financial bear market. An example is major repairs to a home not covered by insurance caused by water incursion or an earthquake. The effects of such possible emergencies in addition to uncertain investment returns are considered in Pye (2010). Under conditions where a 4 percent withdrawal might otherwise be reasonably sustainable, reasonable assumptions about the chances for an emergency each year and its cost reduce the withdrawal from 4 to about 3 percent.

This latter analysis also differs by using the Retrenchment Rule to determine the value of the withdrawal each period. This rule is discussed in Pye (2010) and also Pye (2012). When using the Retrenchment Rule the default withdrawal each period is the prior withdrawal adjusted for inflation as in the earlier studies. There are conditions, however, when this default withdrawal is not applicable. In particular, the initial withdrawal is related to the prior standard of living of the retiree, not just the withdrawal that is reasonably sustainable. Also, the withdrawal for a period is reduced when a test indicates that such retrenchment is necessary. This occurs when the risk of running out of funds before the end of a plan has become too high given the size of the then current withdrawal and the funds that remain.

== See also ==
- FIRE movement
- Retirement spend-down
