= Retirement spend-down =

Strategy to withdraw assets during retirement

At retirement, individuals stop working and no longer get employment earnings, and enter a phase of their lives, where they rely on the assets they have accumulated, to supply money for their spending needs for the rest of their lives. Retirement spend-down, or withdrawal rate, is the strategy a retiree follows to spend, decumulate or withdraw assets during retirement.

Retirement planning aims to prepare individuals for retirement spend-down, because the different spend-down approaches available to retirees depend on the decisions they make during their working years. Actuaries and financial planners are experts on this topic.

== Importance ==
More than 10,000 Post-World War II baby boomers will reach age 65 in the United States every day between 2014 and 2027. This represents the majority of the more than 78 million Americans born between 1946 and 1964. As of 2014, 74% of these people are expected to be alive in 2030, which highlights that most of them will live for many years beyond retirement. By the year 2000, 1 in every 14 people was age 65 or older. By the year 2050, more than 1 in 6 people are projected to be at least 65 years old. The following statistics emphasize the importance of a well-planned retirement spend-down strategy for these people:

- 87% of workers do not feel very confident about having enough money to retire comfortably.
- 80% of retirees do not feel very confident about maintaining financial security throughout their remaining lifetime.
- 56% of workers have not tried to calculate their income needs in retirement.
- 49% of workers over age 55 have less than $50,000 of savings.
- 35% of workers are not currently saving for retirement.
- 25% of workers have not saved at all for retirement.

== Longevity risk ==
Individuals each have their own retirement aspirations, but all retirees face longevity risk – the risk of outliving their assets. This can spell financial disaster. Avoiding this risk is therefore a baseline goal that any successful retirement spend-down strategy addresses. Generally, longevity risk is greatest for low and middle income individuals.

The probabilities of a 65-year-old living to various ages are:

Probability	Male	Female
75%	78	81
50%	85	88
25%	91	93

Longevity risk is largely underestimated. Most retirees do not expect to live beyond age 85, let alone into their 90s. A 2007 study of recently retired individuals asked them to rank the following risks in order of the level of concern they present:

- Health care costs
- Inflation
- Investment risk
- Maintaining lifestyle
- Need for long-term care
- Outliving assets (longevity risk)

Longevity risk was ranked as the least concerning of these risks.

== Withdrawal rate ==
A portion of retirement income often comes from savings, sometimes referred to as a nest egg. Analyzing one's savings involves a number of variables:

- how savings are invested (e.g., cash, stocks, bonds, real estate), and how this changes over time
- inflation during retirement
- how quickly savings are spent – the withdrawal rate

Often, an investor will change some of their investment types as one ages. A common strategy to replace more risky investments with less risky investments as one gets older. A "risky" investment is an investment that has a higher potential return but also a higher potential loss. A "conservative" investment is an investment with a low potential return but a lower potential loss. A number of approaches exist to assist with choosing the correct risk level, for example, target date funds.

A common rule of thumb for withdrawal rate is 4%, based on 20th century American investment returns, and first articulated in Bengen (1994). Bengen later stated the 4% guideline was intended as a "worst case scenario" for retirees in United States, using a hypothetical example of someone who retired in 1968 at a stock market peak before a protracted recession period and high inflation through the 1970s. In that scenario, a 4% withdrawal rate allowed the investor's funds to last 30 years. Historically, Bengen says closer to 7% is an average safe withdrawal rate and at other times withdrawal rates up to 13% have been feasible.

A 4% withdrawal rate is also one conclusion of the Trinity study (1998). This particular rule and approach have been heavily criticized, as have the methods of both sources, with critics arguing that withdrawal rates should vary with investment style (which they do in Bengen) and returns, and that this ignores the risk of emergencies and rising expenses (e.g., medical or long-term care). Others question the suitability of matching relatively fixed expenses with risky investment assets.

New dynamic adjustment methods for retirement withdrawal rates have been developed after Bengen's 4% withdrawal rate was proposed: constant inflation-adjusted spending, Bengen's floor-and-ceiling rule, and Guyton and Klinger's decision rules. More complex withdrawal strategies have also been created.

To decide a withdrawal rate, history shows the maximum sustainable inflation-adjusted withdrawal rate over rolling 30-year periods for three hypothetical stock and bond portfolios from 1926 to 2014. Stocks are represented by the S&P 500 Index, bonds by an index of five-year U.S. Treasury bonds. During the best 30-year period withdrawal rates of 10% annually could be used with a 100% success rate. The worst 30-year period had a maximum withdrawal rate of 3.5%. A 4% withdrawal rate survived most 30 year periods. The higher the stock allocation the higher rate of success. A portfolio of 75% stocks is more volatile but had higher maximum withdrawal rates. Starting with a withdrawal rate near 4% and a minimum 50% equity allocation in retirement gave a higher probability of success in historical 30 year periods.

The above withdrawal strategies, sometimes referred to as strategic withdrawal plans or structured withdrawal plans, focus only on spend-down of invested assets and do not typically coordinate with retirement income from other sources, such as Social Security, pensions, and annuities. Under the actuarial approach described below for equating total personal assets with total spending liabilities to develop a sustainable spending budget, the amount to be withdrawn from invested assets each year is equal to the amount to be spent during the year (the spending budget) reduced by income from other sources for the year.

== Sources of retirement income ==
Individuals may receive retirement income from a variety of sources:

- Personal savings and interest
- Retirement savings plans (i.e., individual retirement account (United States), Registered Retirement Savings Plan (Canada))
- Defined contribution plans (i.e., 401(k), 403(b), SIMPLE, 457(b), etc.)
- Defined benefit pension plans
- Social Insurance (i.e., Canada Pension Plan, Old Age Security (Canada), National Insurance (United Kingdom), Social Security (United States))
- Rental income
- Annuities
- Dividends
- Copyright royalties
- Sale of assets to provide income
- Tontines
- Work during retirement

Each has unique risk, eligibility, tax, timing, form of payment, and distribution considerations that should be integrated into a retirement spend-down strategy.

== Modeling retirement spend-down: traditional approach ==
Traditional retirement spend-down approaches generally take the form of a gap analysis. Essentially, these tools collect a variety of input variables from an individual and use them to project the likelihood that the individual will meet specified retirement goals. They model the shortfall or surplus between the individual's retirement income and expected spending needs to identify whether the individual has adequate resources to retire at a particular age. Depending on their sophistication, they may be stochastic (often incorporating Monte Carlo simulation) or deterministic.

Standard input variables

- Current age
- Expected retirement date or age
- Life expectancy
- Current savings
- Savings rate
- Current salary
- Salary increase rate
- Tax rate
- Inflation rate
- Rate of return on investments
- Expected retirement expenses

Additional input variables that can enhance model sophistication

- Marital status
- Spouse's age
- Spouse's assets
- Health status
- Medical expense inflation
- Estimated social security benefit
- Estimated benefits from employer sponsored plans
- Asset class weights comprising personal savings
- Detailed expected retirement expenses
- Value of home and mortgage balance
- Life insurance holdings
- Expected post-retirement part-time income

Output

- Shortfall or surplus

There are three primary approaches utilized to estimate an individual's spending needs in retirement:

- Income replacement ratios: financial experts generally suggest that individuals need at least 70% of their pre-retirement income to maintain their standard of living. This approach is criticized from the standpoint that expenses, such as those related to health care, are not stable over time.
- Consumption smoothing: under this approach individuals develop a target expenditure pattern, generally far before retirement, that is intended to remain level throughout their lives. Proponents argue that individuals often spend conservatively earlier in their lives and could increase their overall utility and living standard by smoothing their consumption.
- Direct expense modeling: with the help of financial experts, individuals attempt to estimate future expenses directly, using projections of inflation, health care costs, and other variables to provide a framework for the analysis.

== Adverse impact of market downturn and lower interest rates ==
Market volatility can have a significant impact on both a worker's retirement preparedness and a retiree's retirement spend-down strategy. American workers lost an estimated $2 trillion in retirement savings during the 2008 financial crisis. 54% of workers lost confidence in their ability to retire comfortably due to the direct impact of the market turmoil on their retirement savings.

Asset allocation contributed significantly to these issues. Basic investment principles recommend that individuals reduce their equity investment exposure as they approach retirement. Studies show, however, that 43% of 401(k) participants had equity exposure in excess of 70% at the beginning of 2008.

World Pensions Council (WPC) leading experts have argued that durably low interest rates in most G20 countries will have an adverse impact on the underfunding condition of pension funds as "without returns that outstrip inflation, pension investors face the real value of their savings declining rather than ratcheting up over the next few years"

From 1982 until 2011, most Western economies experienced a period of low inflation combined with relatively high returns on investments across all asset classes including government bonds. This brought a certain sense of complacency amongst some pension actuarial consultants and regulators, making it seem reasonable to use optimistic economic assumptions to calculate the present value of future pension liabilities.

The potentially long-lasting collapse in returns on government bonds is taking place against the backdrop of a protracted fall in returns for other core-assets such as blue chip companies'stocks, and, more importantly, a silent demographic shock. Factoring in the corresponding longevity risk, pension premiums could be raised significantly while disposable incomes stagnate and employees work longer years before retiring.

== Coping with retirement spend-down challenges ==
Longevity risk becomes more of a concern for individuals when their retirement savings are depleted by asset losses. Following the market downturn of 2008–09, 61% of working baby boomers are concerned about outliving their retirement assets. Traditional spend-down approaches generally recommend three ways they can attempt to address this risk:

- Save more (spend less)
- Invest more aggressively
- Lower their standard of living

Saving more and investing more aggressively are difficult strategies for many individuals to implement due to constraints imposed by current expenses or an aversion to increased risk. Most individuals also are averse to lowering their standard of living. The closer individuals are to retirement, the more drastic these measures must be for them to have a significant impact on the individuals' retirement savings or spend-down strategies.

== Postponing retirement ==
Individuals tend to have more control over their retirement age than over savings rates, asset returns, or expenses. That makes postponing retirement one of the most effective strategies for improving retirement outcomes. Research shows that delaying from age 62 to 66 can increase retirement income by about 33%.

Postponing retirement minimizes the probability of running out of retirement savings in several ways:

- Additional returns are earned on savings that otherwise would be paid out as retirement income
- Additional savings are accumulated from a longer wage-earning period
- The post-retirement period is shortened
- Other sources of retirement income increase in value (Social Security, defined contribution plans, defined benefit pension plans)

Studies show that nearly half of all workers expect to delay their retirement because they have accumulated fewer retirement assets than they had planned. Much of this is attributable to the market downturn of 2008–2009. Various unforeseen circumstances cause nearly half of all workers to retire earlier than they intend. In many cases, these individuals intend to work part-time during retirement. Again, however, statistics show that this is far less common than intentions would suggest.

== Modeling retirement spend-down: alternative approach ==
The appeal of retirement age flexibility is the focal point of an actuarial approach to retirement spend-down that has spawned in response to the surge of baby boomers approaching retirement.

The approach is based on personal asset/liability matching process and present values to determine current year and future year spending budget data points. This self-adjusting actuarial process is very similar to the process employed by pension actuaries to help pension plan sponsors determine current and future years’ annual contribution requirements.

== Similarity to individual asset/liability modeling ==
Most approaches to retirement spend-down can be likened to individual asset/liability modeling. Regardless of the strategy employed, they seek to ensure that individuals' assets available for retirement are sufficient to fund their post-retirement liabilities and expenses. This is elaborated in dedicated portfolio theory.

== See also ==
- Trinity study
