= Asset/liability modeling =

Asset/liability modeling is the process used to manage the business and financial objectives of a financial institution or an individual through an assessment of the portfolio assets and liabilities in an integrated manner. The process is characterized by an ongoing review, modification and revision of asset and liability management strategies so that sensitivity to interest rate changes are confined within acceptable tolerance levels.

Different models use different elements based on specific needs and contexts. An individual or an organization may keep parts of the ALM process and outsource the modeling function or adapt the model according to the requirements and capabilities of relevant institutions such as banks, which often have their in-house modeling process. There is a vast array of models available today for practical asset and liability modeling and these have been the subject of several research studies.

== Asset/liability modeling (pension) ==
In 2008, a financial crisis drove the 100 largest corporate pension plans to a record $300 billion loss of funded status. In the wake of those losses, many pension plan sponsors reexamined their pension plan asset allocation strategies, to consider risk exposures. A recent study indicates that many corporate defined benefit plans fail to address the full range of risks facing them, especially the ones related to liabilities. Too often, the study says, corporate pensions are distracted by concerns that have nothing to do with the long-term health of the fund. Asset/liability modeling is an approach to examining pension risks and allows the sponsor to set informed policies for funding, benefit design and asset allocation.

Asset/liability modeling goes beyond the traditional, asset-only analysis of the asset-allocation decision. Traditional asset-only models analyze risk and rewards in terms of investment performance. Asset/liability models take a comprehensive approach to analyze risk and rewards in terms of the overall pension plan impact. An actuary or investment consultant may look at expectations and downside risk measures on the present value of contributions, plan surplus, excess returns (asset return less liability return), asset returns and any number of other variables. The model may consider measures over 5-, 10- or 20-year horizons, as well as quarterly or annual value at risk measures.

Pension plans face a variety of liability risks, including price and wage inflation, interest rate, and longevity. While some of these risks materialize slowly over time, others – such as interest rate risk – are felt with each measurement period. Liabilities are the actuarial present value of future plan cash flows, discounted at current interest rates. Thus, asset/liability management strategies often include bonds and swaps or other derivatives to accomplish some degree of interest rate hedging (immunization, cash flow matching, duration matching, etc.). Such approaches are sometimes called “liability-driven investment” (LDI) strategies. In 2008, plans with such approaches strongly outperformed those with traditional “total return” seeking investment policies.

== Asset/liability studies ==
Successful asset/liability studies:

- Increase a plan sponsor’s understanding of the pension plan’s current situation and likely future trends
- Highlight key asset and liability risks that should be considered
- Help establish a cohesive risk-management framework
- Analyze surplus return, standard deviation, funding status, contribution requirements and balance-sheet impacts
- Consider customized risk measures based on the plan sponsor, plan design and time horizon
- Help design an appropriate strategic investment strategy
- Provide insight into current market dislocations and practical implications for the near term

Historically, most pension plan sponsors conducted comprehensive asset/liability studies every three to five years, or after a significant change in demographics, plan design, funding status, sponsor circumstances, or funding legislation. Recent trends suggest more frequent studies and/or a desire for regular tracking of key asset/liability risk metrics in between formal studies.

== Additional challenges ==
In the United States, the Pension Protection Act of 2006 (PPA) introduced stricter standards on pension plans, requiring higher funding targets and larger contributions from plan sponsors. With growing deficits and PPA funding requirements looming large, there is an unprecedented need for asset/liability modeling and overall pension risk management.

== Asset/liability modeling for individuals ==
Some financial advisors offer Monte Carlo simulation tools aimed at helping individuals plan for retirement. These tools are designed to model the individual’s likelihood of assets surpassing expenses (liabilities).

Proponents of Monte Carlo simulation contend that these tools are valuable because they offer simulation using randomly ordered returns based on a set of reasonable parameters. For example, the tool can model retirement cash flows 500 or 1,000 times, reflecting a range of possible outcomes.

Some critics of these tools claim that the consequences of failure are not laid out and argue that these tools are no better than typical retirement tools that use standard assumptions. Recent financial turmoil has fueled the claims of critics who believe that Monte Carlo simulation tools are inaccurate and overly optimistic.

== See also ==
- Net worth
- High-net-worth individual
