= Inflation hedge =

Investment intended to protect an investor against inflation or hedge

Inflation hedge is an asset, contract or strategy that aims to preserve purchasing power when the general price level rises (that is, inflation). Definitions differ. Research separates expected inflation, which may already be priced, from unexpected inflation which is an unanticipated change. The effectiveness of any hedge depends on horizon and regime. Over twelve-month horizons some assets react to an inflation surprise, while over multi-year horizons those relationships can weaken or reverse as policy and the macroeconomy adjust. No single asset class provides a permanent hedge against unexpected inflation. Instruments that link cash flows to a consumer price index and market-based measures of inflation compensation address specific risks, although realised outcomes depend on index choice, publication lags, liquidity and risk premia, taxation and implementation costs.

== Concepts and measurement ==
An inflation hedge is an asset or strategy that tends to preserve purchasing power when the general price level rises. In finance research a hedge has a non-positive correlation with the relevant risk on average, a safe haven is uncorrelated or negatively correlated during market stress only, and a diversifier is positively but not perfectly correlated in normal times. Studies also separate expected from unexpected inflation. Attié and Roache report that many risky assets respond negatively to the unexpected component at business-cycle horizons, even when long-run premia are positive.

Empirical work often summarises sensitivity using an inflation beta estimated from a regression of returns on inflation over a matched horizon. If $r$ denotes an asset return and $\pi$ denotes inflation, the inflation beta $\beta_{\pi}$ can be estimated from $r=\alpha+\beta_{\pi}\,\pi+\varepsilon$. A value near $1$ implies a close hedge at that horizon, whereas values near $0$ or negative indicate weak or inverse co-movement. Estimates are sample-dependent and can vary across regimes. Relationships observed in one era may not hold out of sample.

Market-implied measures of expected inflation, such as breakevens from inflation-linked bonds or zero-coupon inflation swaps, are widely used but reflect more than pure expectations. They embed inflation-risk premia and, at times, a liquidity premium. Breakevens and swaps are informative but imperfect gauges for hedging decisions. Measurement also depends on the index that matters to the holder. A national CPI may not match a specific spending basket, and contractual indexation can lag official data. Both create basis risk.

== Time-horizon and regime effects ==
Horizon matters. Using twelve-month windows, Attié and Roache find that commodities tend to move with inflation after an upside surprise, while equities and nominal bonds weaken and cash adjusts only partly as policy rates change. Over multi-year horizons the picture changes. Vector error-correction models suggest that the initial commodity response fades as supply and demand normalise, nominal bonds recover part of their loss as higher running yields accrue, and equities still fail to hedge unexpected inflation even though they can deliver positive real premia over very long periods.

Summary of typical asset sensitivities by horizon (illustrative)
Asset class	Twelve-month horizon	Multi-year horizon
Commodities	Partial hedge after surprises	Relationship weakens over time
Equities	Tends to underperform after surprises	Long-run premia do not reliably hedge shocks
Nominal bonds	Prices fall when yields rise	Partial recovery as higher yields accrue
Cash (T-bills)	Partial adjustment via policy rates	Depends on policy stance and inflation regime

== Evidence by asset class ==
=== Inflation-linked bonds ===
Inflation-indexed bonds such as United States TIPS and index-linked gilts adjust principal by a CPI. In the United States the reference is CPI-U (NSA) with a three-month indexation lag, and coupons are paid twice a year. Principal adjustments and coupon income are taxable in most jurisdictions. These bonds can provide a direct hedge over matching horizons, but they still carry real-rate duration risk and the reference index may not match a holder's spending basket. Measures such as breakeven inflation derived from linkers embed risk and liquidity premia. They are informative but not a pure read of expected inflation. TIPS were first auctioned in January 1997, and issuance later expanded which improved market depth. That scale helps.

=== Commodities (including gold) ===
Attié and Roache show that diversified commodity exposures tend to co-move with inflation over twelve-month horizons after upside surprises. The relationship weakens over longer periods as macroeconomic and policy dynamics evolve. Using United States data for 1959 to 2004, Gorton and Rouwenhorst report that fully collateralised commodity futures delivered positive real returns and inflation-sensitive behaviour distinct from equities and bonds. Evidence that energy components contribute strongly to short-horizon sensitivity appears in several studies of commodity indices and sector returns. Evidence on gold is mixed. Studies distinguish gold's roles as a diversifier or episodic safe haven from its inflation-hedging properties, and results differ across markets and periods.

=== Equities ===
Fama and Schwert find that equities generally do not hedge unexpected inflation at business-cycle horizons. Estimated inflation betas are often negative when inflation surprises to the upside. Attié and Roache reach a similar short-horizon conclusion across asset classes. Over long spans many markets exhibit positive real equity premia, but that performance does not imply a reliable hedge against inflation shocks. Sector outcomes vary with pricing power, regulation and financing conditions.

=== Nominal government bonds ===
Nominal bonds are sensitive to inflation surprises because yields tend to rise when inflation or inflation risk increases, which lowers prices in the short run. Over longer periods higher running yields can offset part of the initial drawdown, but nominal bonds are not designed to hedge unexpected inflation, and the effect depends on the maturity profile and the monetary regime.

=== Cash (Treasury bills) ===
Cash returns adjust as policy rates move, so cash can mitigate higher inflation in the near term. The adjustment is typically less than one-for-one with the inflation rate over short horizons. Effectiveness depends on the speed and extent of policy response and on the inflation measure relevant to the holder.

=== Real assets (property and infrastructure) ===
Evidence for real estate and infrastructure is mixed and state-dependent. Direct property can include contractual lease indexation that tracks consumer prices, while listed real estate often behaves more like equities. Some regulated infrastructure assets have cash flows that are contractually linked to CPI, although the strength of the linkage depends on the concession terms and regulation.

=== Inflation swaps and market-implied inflation ===
Zero-coupon inflation swaps exchange a fixed rate for realised inflation over a period and are used to transfer inflation risk or to extract market-implied compensation. Transaction-level UK evidence documents who buys and who sells inflation risk and shows how liquidity conditions affect pricing. When linker market liquidity is impaired, swaps can be a useful alternative to breakevens, though swap rates also embed premia.

=== Cryptoassets ===
Academic and policy studies report mixed and regime-dependent results for cryptocurrencies, with limited evidence of a stable or reliable inflation-hedging property. Some papers find episodic co-movement with inflation or with assets that respond to inflation, while others find weak or no hedging ability across samples. The literature generally does not support treating cryptoassets as a consistent inflation hedge.

== Implementation considerations and limitations ==
Outcomes depend on the definition of inflation, the horizon and the instruments used. Basis risk can arise if the index embedded in a contract differs from the index that matters to the holder, and indexation in bonds and leases can lag official data. For TIPS the lag is roughly three months. Market-implied measures such as breakevens and inflation swaps include risk and liquidity premia, so they do not equal expected inflation one-for-one. Costs and frictions also matter. These include bid–ask spreads, futures roll and collateral requirements for commodity strategies, tax treatment of indexation and coupons, and the effect of changes in real yields on the prices of inflation-linked and nominal bonds.

== Portfolio construction ==
Long-horizon investors often combine assets rather than rely on a single instrument. Studies and official guidance discuss mixes of Inflation-indexed bonds, diversified commodity exposures and, in some cases, real estate to address different channels of inflation risk. Liability-driven investors that face indexed obligations use TIPS or other linkers and may add inflation swaps to match cash flows more closely or to fine-tune duration. Portfolio choices depend on objectives, constraints and regime assessments.

== Historical episodes ==
=== 1970s inflation in advanced economies ===
During the 1970s many advanced economies experienced high and volatile inflation. Short-horizon evidence indicates that commodities tended to perform well around inflation surges, while nominal bonds and equities faced headwinds as yields rose and valuations adjusted. Those short-run relationships did not always persist over longer horizons as policy regimes evolved.

=== 2021–2022 global inflation rise ===
The rise in inflation in 2021 to 2022 saw energy and some commodity prices increase, while nominal bond prices declined as yields rose. Inflation-linked bonds provided a more direct linkage to consumer prices over matching horizons, although real-yield moves affected their prices, and equities did not reliably offset inflation surprises over short horizons. These patterns are consistent with horizon and regime dependence in the literature.

== See also ==
- Inflation-indexed bond
- Inflation swap
- Real asset
- Stagflation
