= American Gold Eagle =

Gold bullion coin of the United States

Gold Eagle
- United States
- Value: 5–50 U.S. dollars (face value); see specifications
- Edge: Reeded
- Composition: 91.67% Au, 3% Ag, 5.33% Cu
- Years of minting: 1986–present (bullion); 1986–2008, 2010–present (proof); 2006–2008, 2011–present (uncirculated)

Obverse
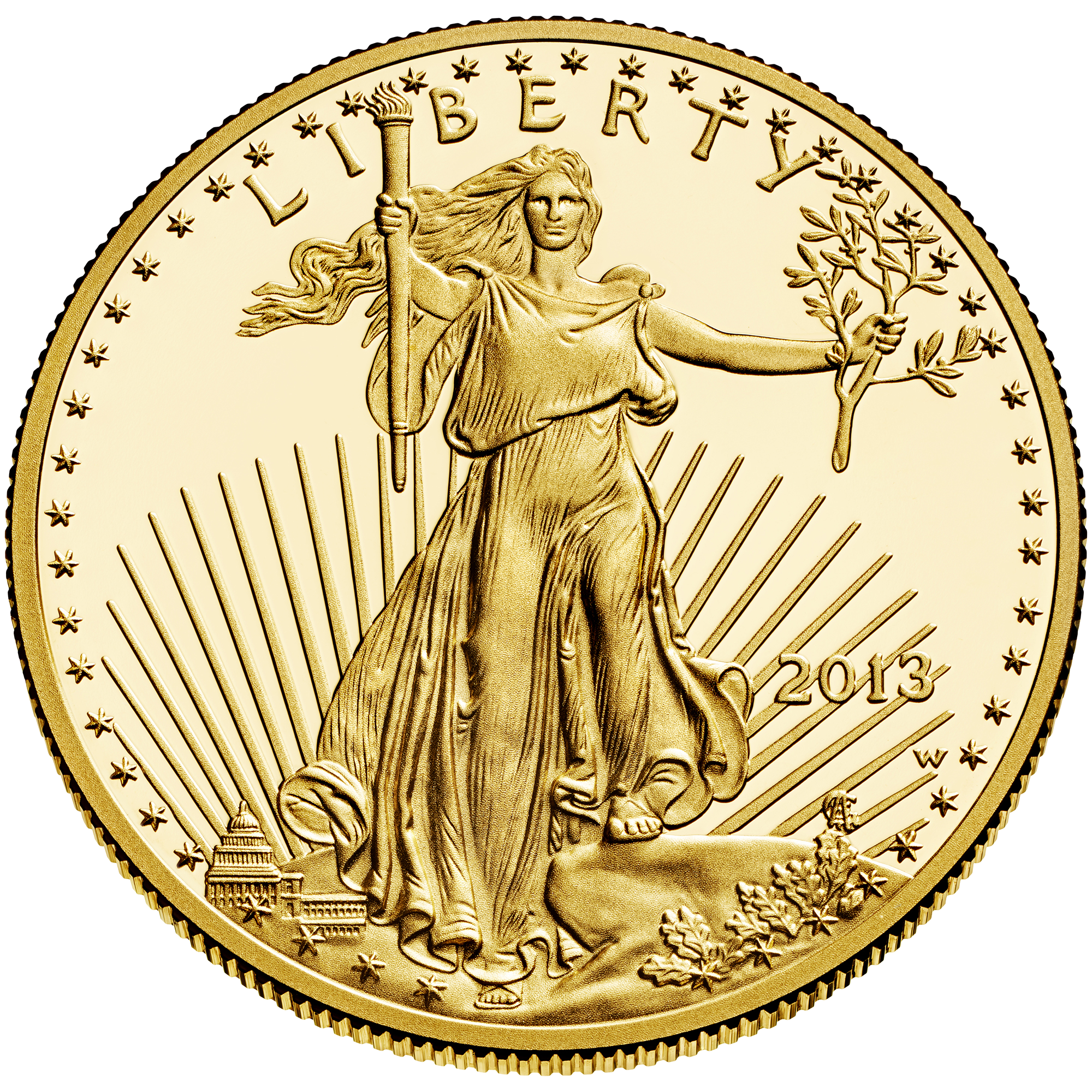
- Design: Liberty
- Designer: Augustus Saint-Gaudens
- Design date: 1907
- Design used: 1986–present

Reverse
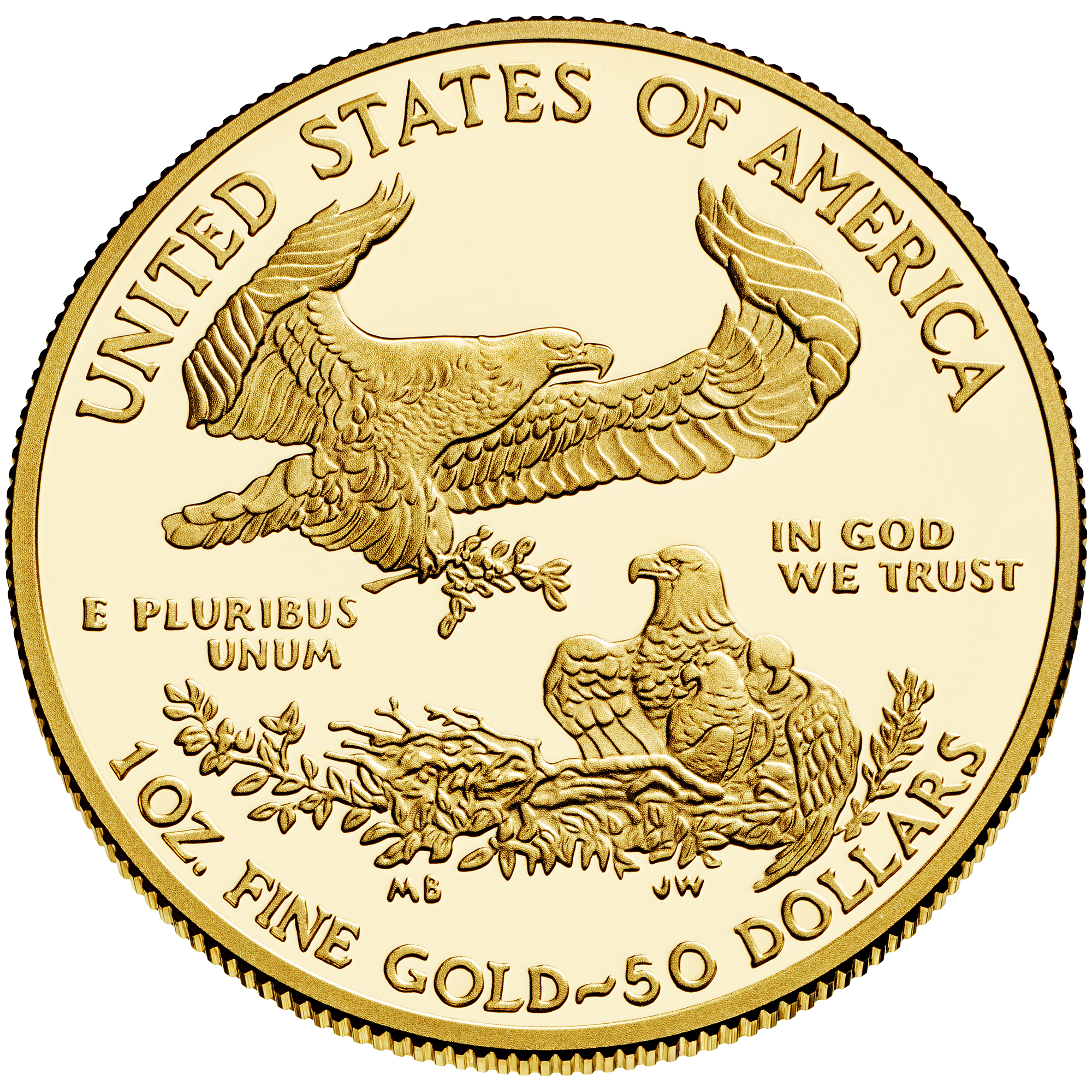
- Design: Eagle landing on a nest
- Designer: Miley Busiek
- Design date: 1986
- Design used: 1986–2021
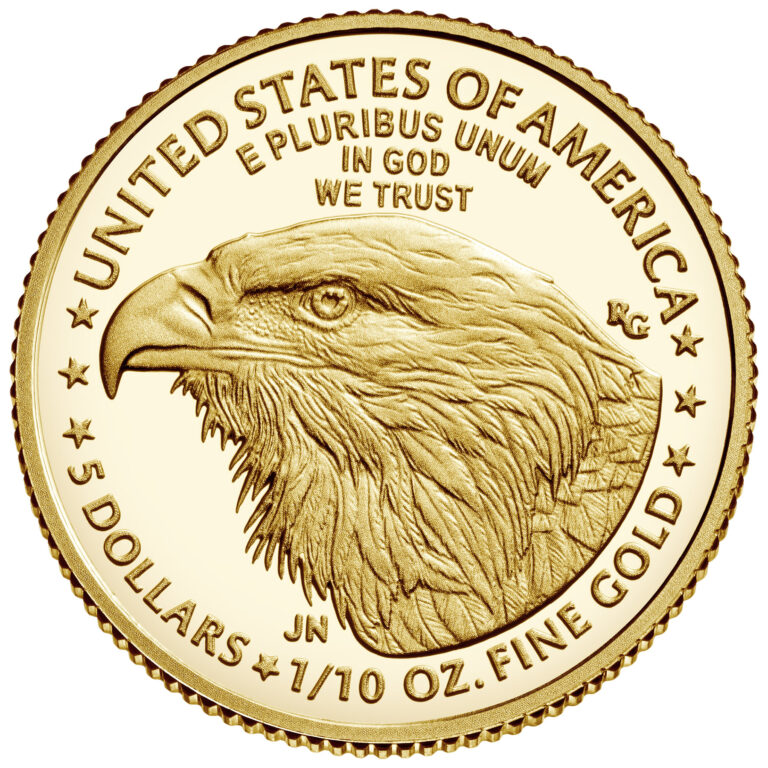
- Design: Side profile of a Bald eagle
- Designer: Jennie Norris
- Design date: 2021
- Design used: 2021–present

The American Gold Eagle is an official gold bullion coin of the United States. Authorized under the Gold Bullion Coin Act of 1985, it was first released by the United States Mint in 1986. Because the term "eagle" also is the official United States designation for the pre-1933 ten dollar gold coin, the weight of the bullion coin is typically used when describing American Gold Eagles (e.g., "1/2-ounce American Gold Eagle") to avoid confusion with the pre-1933 coins. This is particularly true with the 1/4-oz American Gold Eagle, which has a marked face value of ten dollars, the same as that of its predecessor.

== Details ==
Offered in 1/10 oz, 1/4 oz, 1/2 oz, and 1 oz denominations, these coins are guaranteed by the U.S. government to contain the stated amount of actual gold weight in troy ounces. By law, the gold must come from sources in the United States, alloyed with silver and copper to produce a more wear-resistant coin. In addition, sales of these and other specie coins from the US Mint are mandated, at least in part, to pay off the national debt.

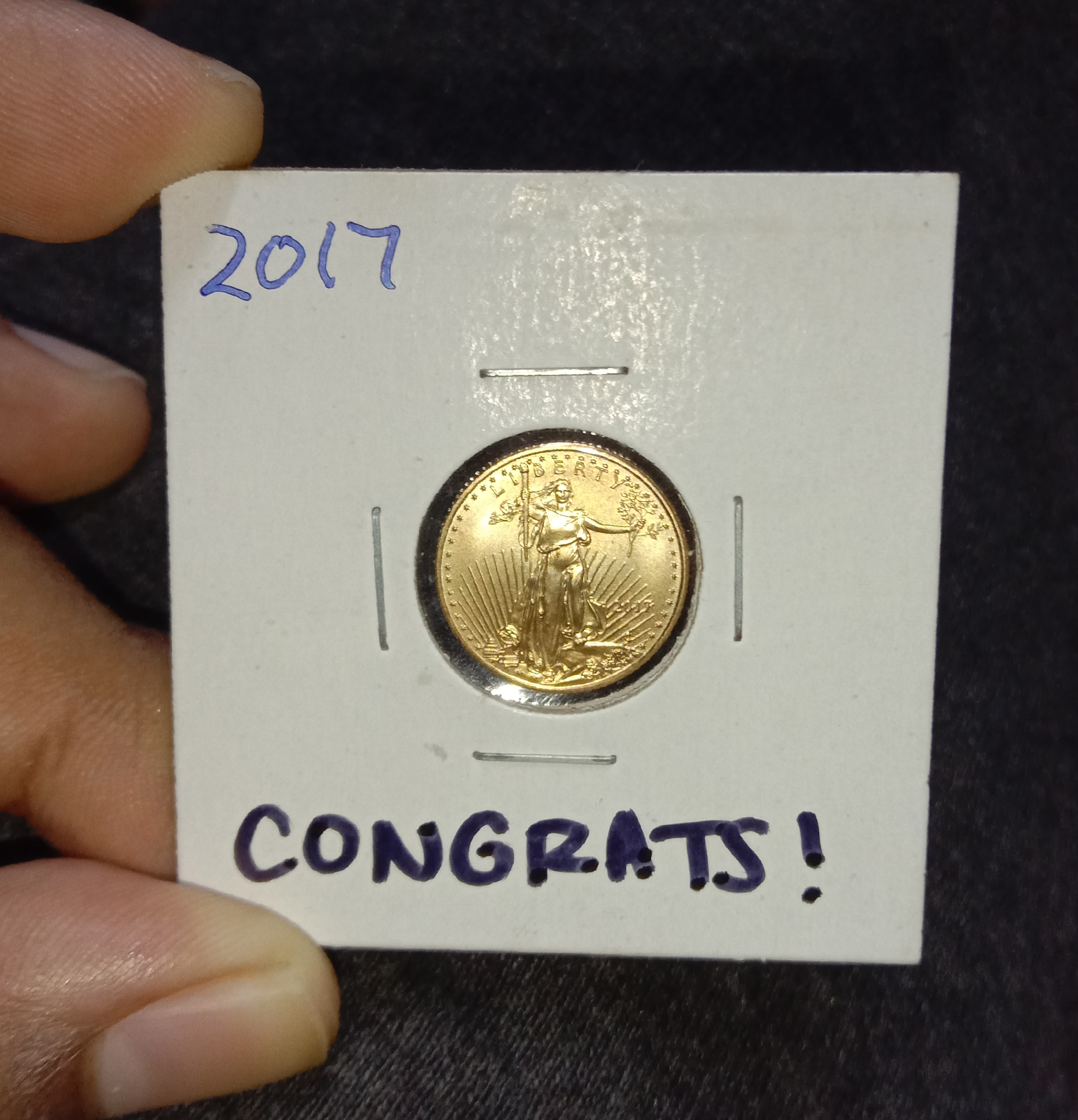
Obverse of an 1/10 oz American Gold Eagle of 2017

The 22 kt gold alloy is an English standard traditionally referred to as "crown gold". Crown gold alloys had not been used in U.S. coins since 1834, with the gold content having dropped since 1837 to a standard of 0.900 fine for U.S. gold coins. For American Gold Eagles the gold fraction was increased again to .9167 or (22 karat). It is authorized by the United States Congress and is backed by the United States Mint for weight and content.

The obverse design features a rendition of Augustus Saint-Gaudens' full-length figure of Lady Liberty with flowing hair, holding a torch in her right hand and an olive branch in her left, with the Capitol building in the left background. The design is taken from the $20 Saint-Gaudens gold coin which was commissioned by Theodore Roosevelt to create coins like the ancient Greek and Roman coins.

For mint years 1986 to 2021, the reverse design by sculptor Miley Busiek Frost (MB) featured a male eagle carrying an olive branch flying above a nest containing a female eagle and the pair's two eaglets. Frost says that the design is "a symbolic tribute to the American family, senior citizens and young people." Frost's design drawing was sculpted for the reverse of the Gold Eagle by US Mint sculptor-engraver Sherl Joseph Winter (JW). Hence, on the reverse of these coins, the initials MB and JW are inscribed.

In 2021, the US Mint introduced a new reverse design on the American Gold Eagle featuring a close-up head portrait of an eagle. This design was created by US Mint artistic designer Jennie Norris (JN) and sculpted by US Mint medallic artist Renata Gordon (RG). Hence, Gold Eagles from 2021 onwards, show the initials JN and RG on each side of the eagle head design. Norris explains her design inspiration as follows: “The American Eagle is such a noble bird. I was hoping to capture the intensity of his stare through the close cropping. His gaze speaks of pride and wisdom passed down through generations of time.”

== Specifications ==
Gold Eagles minted 1986–1991 are dated with Roman numerals. In 1992, the U.S. Mint switched to Arabic numerals for dating Gold Eagles.

The 1/10, 1/4, and 1/2 troy oz coins are identical in design to the 1 troy oz coin except for the markings on the reverse side that indicate the weight and face value of the coin (for example, 1 OZ. fine gold~50 dollars). The print on the smaller coins is, therefore, finer and less legible than on larger denominations.

Each of the four sizes contains 91.67% gold (22 karat), 3% silver, and 5.33% copper.
| Denomination | 1/10 troy oz | 1/4 troy oz | 1/2 troy oz | 1 troy oz |
|---|---|---|---|---|
| Diameter | 16.5 mm | 22mm | 27 mm | 32.70 mm |
| Thickness | 1.19 mm | 1.83 mm | 2.24 mm | 2.87 mm |
| Gross weight | 0.1091 troy oz (3.393 g) | 0.2727 troy oz (8.483 g) | 0.5454 troy oz (16.965 g) | 1.0909 troy oz (33.931 g) |
| Face value | $5 | $10 | $25 | $50 |

The 22k gold alloyed makeup of Gold Eagle coins stands in contrast to the 24k Gold Buffalo Coin, which is minted entirely from .9999 fine gold, and therefore weighs less (1 troy oz or 31.1035 grams gross).

== Value ==
The market value of the coins is generally about equal to the market value of their gold content, not their face value. Like all commodities, this value fluctuates with market forces. The face values are proportional to the weights except for the 1/4 oz coin.

While their actual selling price (purchasing power) varies based on the spot price of gold, these coins carry face values of $5, $10, $25, and $50. These are their legal values, reflecting their issue and monetized value as "Gold Dollars," as opposed to standard bullion. They are legal tender for all debts public and private at their face values. These face values do not reflect their intrinsic value which is much greater and is mainly influenced by their weight and the price of precious metal. For example, on September 13, 2019, the U.S. Mint sold the 2016 one-ounce coin ($50 face value) at $1,510.00. Since the coins can be "paid" only at a disadvantage to the payer, they are generally held as collectibles rather than used for transactions. Furthermore, US taxpayers are subject to capital gains taxes on profits when a gold coin is sold (unless held in an individual retirement account).

In addition to standard bullion coins (sometimes referred to as "scruffies"), the United States Mint also produces proof and uncirculated versions for coin collectors. These coins carry the Mint's mark ("W") beneath the date, and are produced exclusively at the West Point Mint in West Point, New York (formerly the West Point Bullion Depository).

== Mintages ==
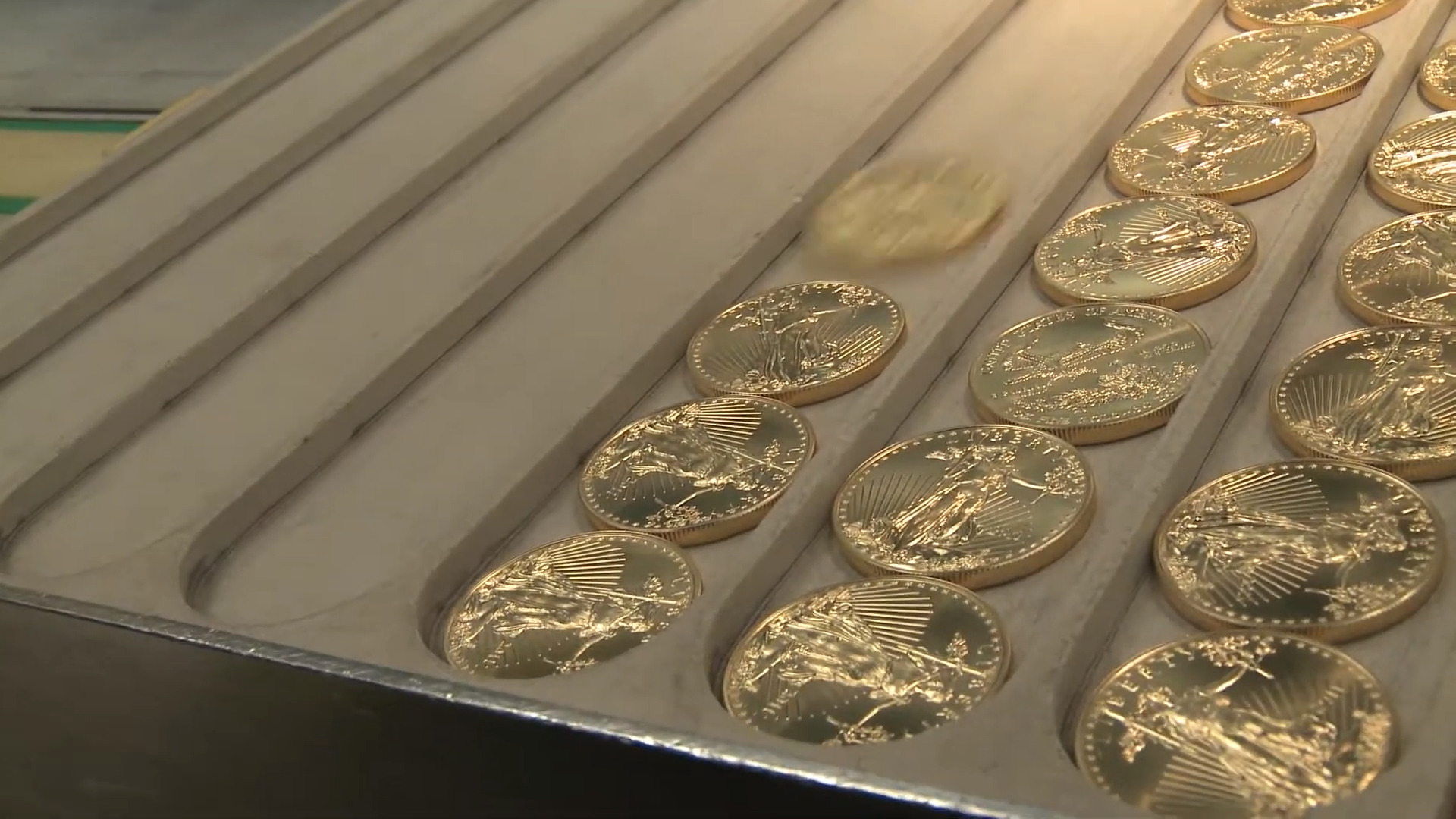
American Gold Eagles immediately after being struck at the West Point Mint in 2011

These final audited mintages from the U.S. Mint include coins sold both individually and as part of multi-coin sets.

=== Annual bullion mintage ===
| Year | $5 – 1/10 oz. | $10 – 1/4 oz. | $25 – 1/2 oz. | $50 – 1 oz. |
|---|---|---|---|---|
| 1986 | 912,609 | 726,031 | 599,566 | 1,362,650 |
| 1987 | 580,266 | 269,255 | 131,255 | 1,045,500 |
| 1988 | 159,500 | 49,000 | 45,000 | 465,500 |
| 1989 | 264,790 | 81,789 | 44,829 | 415,790 |
| 1990 | 210,210 | 41,000 | 31,000 | 373,210 |
| 1991 | 165,200 | 36,100 | 24,100 | 243,100 |
| 1992 | 209,300 | 59,546 | 54,404 | 275,000 |
| 1993 | 210,709 | 71,864 | 73,324 | 480,192 |
| 1994 | 206,380 | 72,650 | 62,400 | 221,663 |
| 1995 | 223,025 | 83,752 | 53,474 | 200,636 |
| 1996 | 401,964 | 60,318 | 39,287 | 189,148 |
| 1997 | 528,515 | 108,805 | 79,605 | 664,508 |
| 1998 | 1,344,520 | 309,829 | 169,029 | 1,468,530 |
| 1999 | 2,750,338 | 564,232 | 263,013 | 1,505,026 |
| 2000 | 569,153 | 128,964 | 79,287 | 433,319 |
| 2001 | 269,147 | 71,280 | 48,047 | 143,605 |
| 2002 | 230,027 | 62,027 | 70,027 | 222,029 |
| 2003 | 245,029 | 74,029 | 79,029 | 416,032 |
| 2004 | 250,016 | 72,014 | 98,040 | 417,019 |
| 2005 | 300,043 | 72,015 | 80,023 | 356,555 |
| 2006 | 285,006 | 60,004 | 66,005 | 237,510 |
| 2007 | 190,010 | 34,004 | 47,002 | 140,016 |
| 2008 | 305,000 | 70,000 | 61,000 | 710,000 |
| 2009 | 270,000 | 110,000 | 110,000 | 1,493,000 |
| 2010 | 435,000 | 86,000 | 81,000 | 1,125,000 |
| 2011 | 350,000 | 80,000 | 70,000 | 857,000 |
| 2012 | 290,000 | 90,000 | 43,000 | 675,000 |
| 2013 | 555,000 | 114,500 | 57,000 | 758,500 |
| 2014 | 545,000 | 90,000 | 35,000 | 425,000 |
| 2015 | 980,000 | 158,000 | 75,000 | 626,500 |
| 2016 | 925,000 | 152,000 | 74,000 | 817,500 |
| 2017 | 395,000 | 64,000 | 37,000 | 228,000 |
| 2018 | 230,000 | 62,000 | 32,000 | 191,000 |
| 2019 | 195,000 | 38,000 | 30,000 | 108,000 |
| 2020 | 350,000 | 106,000 | 70,000 | 747,500 |
| 2021 Type-1 | 150,000 | 56,000 | 31,000 | 456,500 |
| 2021 Type-2 | 350,000 | 108,000 | 65,000 | 665,500 |
| 2022 | 575,000 | 140,000 | 75,000 | 850,000 |
| 2023 | 675,000 | 198,000 | 102,000 | 924,000 |
| 2024 | 540,000 | 102,000 | 49,000 | 308,000 |

=== Annual proof mintage ===
During the series' inaugural year, the Mint only issued 1 troy oz proofs. It added 1/2 troy oz proofs in 1987 and since 1988 has issued proofs in all four denominations. In 2009, due to increased worldwide demand for precious metals that caused supply shortages and the Mint's legal obligations to produce bullion versions, proof and uncirculated versions of the Gold Eagle were not issued. In addition to individual coins, the Mint also produces four-coin proof sets annually since 1988.

| Year | $5 – 1/10 oz. | $10 – 1/4 oz. | $25 – 1/2 oz. | $50 – 1 oz. |
|---|---|---|---|---|
| 1986 | - | - | - | 446,290 |
| 1987 | - | - | 143,398 | 147,498 |
| 1988 | 143,881 | 98,028 | 76,528 | 87,133 |
| 1989 | 84,647 | 54,170 | 44,798 | 54,570 |
| 1990 | 99,349 | 62,674 | 51,636 | 62,401 |
| 1991 | 70,334 | 50,839 | 53,125 | 50,411 |
| 1992 | 64,874 | 46,269 | 40,976 | 44,826 |
| 1993 | 58,649 | 46,464 | 43,819 | 34,369 |
| 1994 | 62,849 | 48,172 | 44,584 | 46,674 |
| 1995 | 62,667 | 47,526 | 45,388 | 46,368 |
| 1996 | 57,047 | 38,219 | 35,058 | 36,153 |
| 1997 | 34,977 | 29,805 | 26,344 | 32,999 |
| 1998 | 39,395 | 29,503 | 25,374 | 25,886 |
| 1999 | 48,428 | 34,417 | 30,427 | 31,427 |
| 2000 | 49,971 | 36,036 | 32,028 | 33,007 |
| 2001 | 37,530 | 25,613 | 23,240 | 24,555 |
| 2002 | 40,864 | 29,242 | 26,646 | 27,499 |
| 2003 | 40,027 | 30,292 | 28,270 | 28,344 |
| 2004 | 35,131 | 28,839 | 27,330 | 28,215 |
| 2005 | 49,265 | 37,207 | 34,311 | 35,246 |
| 2006 | 47,277 | 36,127 | 34,322 | 47,092 |
| 2007 | 58,553 | 46,189 | 44,025 | 51,810 |
| 2008 | 28,116 | 18,877 | 22,602 | 30,237 |
| 2009 | - | - | - | - |
| 2010 | 54,285 | 44,507 | 44,527 | 59,480 |
| 2011 | 42,697 | 28,782 | 26,781 | 48,306 |
| 2012 | 20,740 | 13,775 | 12,809 | 23,630 |
| 2013 | 21,742 | 12,789 | 12,718 | 24,710 |
| 2014 | 22,725 | 14,790 | 14,693 | 28,703 |
| 2015 | 26,769 | 15,775 | 15,820 | 32,652 |
| 2016 | TBD | TBD | TBD | TBD |
| 2017 | 11,158 | 14,516 | 12,717 | 9,245 |
| 2018 | 21,156 | 12,770 | 9,204 | 15,565 |
| 2019 | 17,809 | 10,613 | 9,454 | 14,697 |
| 2020 | 24,033 | 15,806 | 14,020 | 17,358 |
| 2021 T1 | 21,078 | 10,837 | 9,741 | 12,558 |
| 2021 T2 | 24,984 | 13,511 | 12,163 | 15,731 |
| 2022 | 23,712 | 14,370 | 11,876 | 15,819 |
| 2023 | 22,824 | 13,886 | 11,408 | 15,863 |
| 2024 | 8,129 | 14,250 | 6,315 | 8,129 |

=== Annual uncirculated mintage ===
In 2009, the allocation of blanks for the legally required production of bullion Gold Eagles affected both uncirculated coin and proof availability. This suspension continued into 2010 for the uncirculated version. When production resumed in 2011 (without the fractional denominations which had been discontinued in 2008), it was met with a weak collector response. The United States Mint provided audited and finalized annual production sales reports between 2006 and 2012. Afterwards, they published production sales numbers in the weekly cumulative sales reports. The mintage number is the Last Known Sale (LKS), which is the last sales figure published for that product before it was dropped from the sales report.

| Year | $5 – 1/10 oz. | $10 – 1/4 oz. | $25 – 1/2 oz. | $50 – 1 oz. |
|---|---|---|---|---|
| 2006-W | 20,643 | 15,188 | 15,164 | 45,053 |
| 2007-W | 22,501 | 12,766 | 11,455 | 18,066 |
| 2008-W | 12,657 | 8,883 | 16,682 | 11,908 |
| 2009-W | - | - | - | - |
| 2010-W | - | - | - | - |
| 2011-W | - | - | - | 8,729 |
| 2012-W | - | - | - | 5,829 |
| 2013-W | - | - | - | 7,293 |
| 2014-W | - | - | - | 7,902 |
| 2015-W | - | - | - | 6,533 |
| 2016-W | - | - | - | 6,887 |
| 2017-W | - | - | - | 5,800 |
| 2018-W | - | - | - | 8,518 |
| 2019-W | - | - | - | 6,365 |
| 2020-W | - | - | - | 6,284 |
| 2021-W | - | - | - | 9,063 |
| 2022-W | - | - | - | 8,900 |
| 2023-W | - | - | - | 6,592 |
| 2024-W | - | - | - | 2,942 |
| 2025-W | - | - | - | 2,194 |

== See also ==
- American Arts Commemorative Series medallions
- American Silver Eagle
- American Platinum Eagle
- American Palladium Eagle
- American Buffalo
- Australian Kangaroo
- Austrian Philharmonic
- British Britannia
- Canadian Maple Leaf
- Chinese Panda
- Eagle (U.S. coin)
- Gold as an investment
- Inflation hedge
- South African Krugerrand
