= Double eagle =

Gold $20 coin of the United States

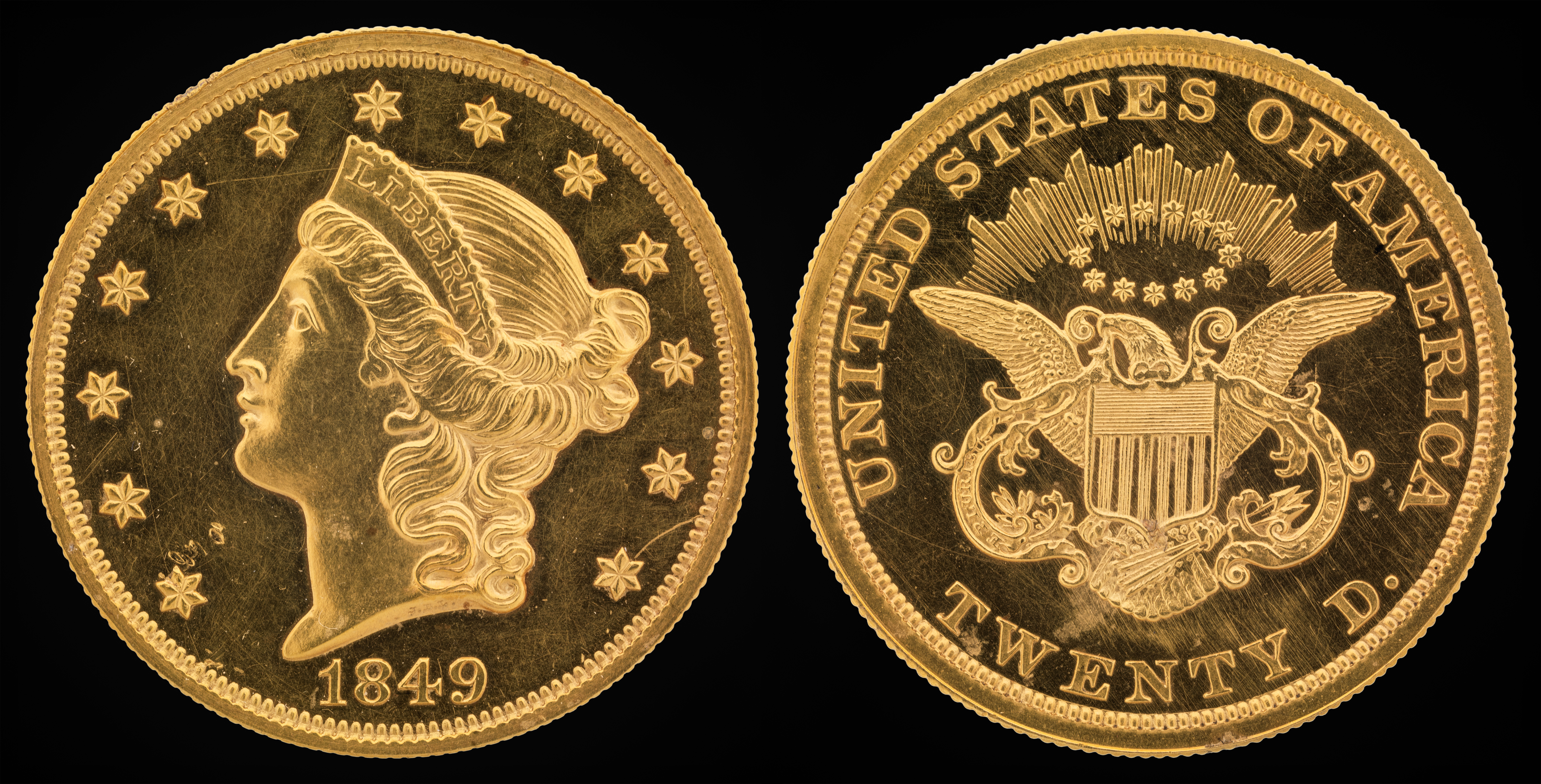
The 1849 Liberty Head design by James B. Longacre

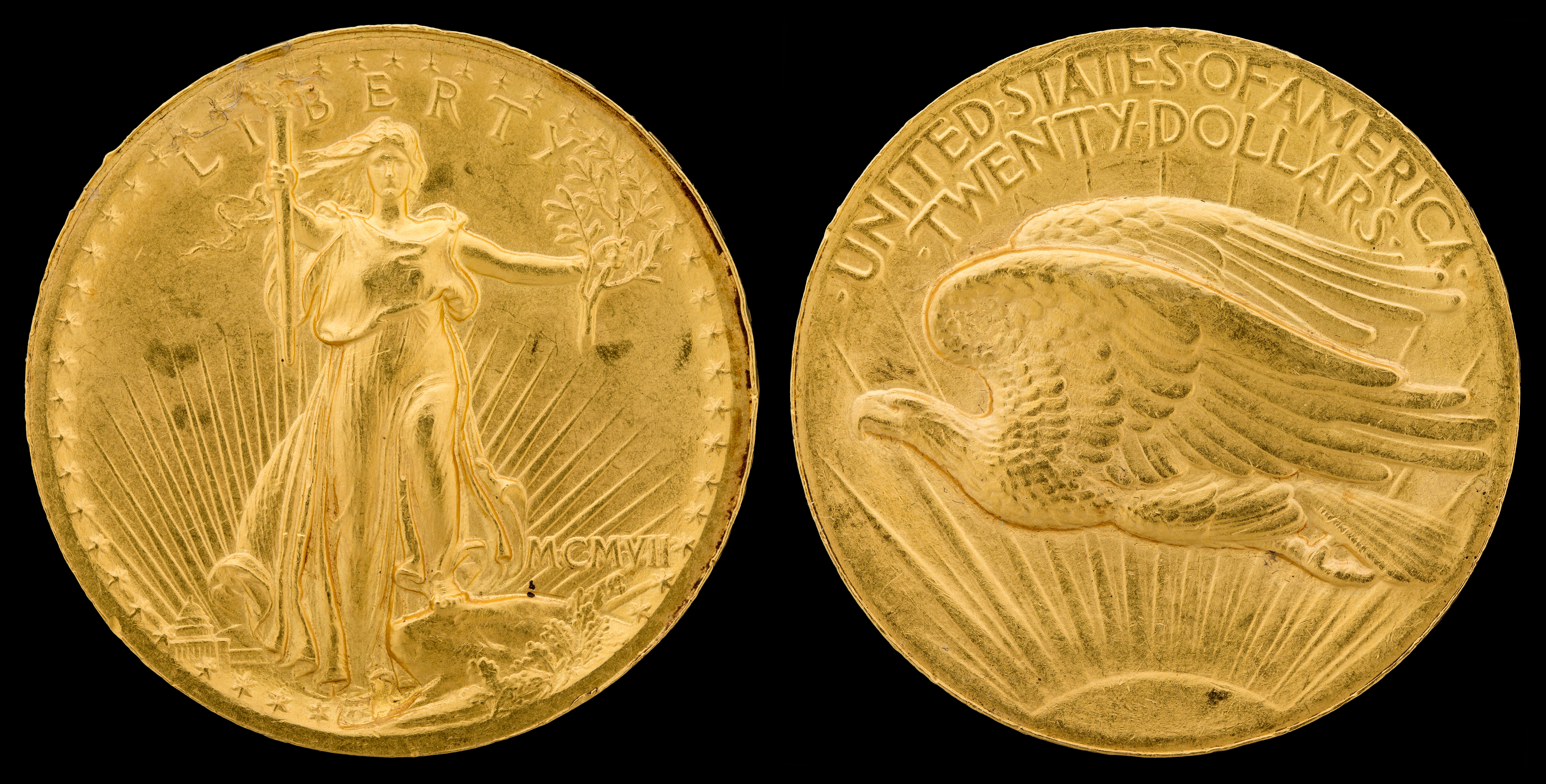
The 1907 high relief double eagle designed by Augustus Saint-Gaudens

A double eagle is a gold coin of the United States with a denomination of $20. (Its gold content of 0.9675 troy ounces [30.09 g] was worth $20 at the 1849 official price of $20.67/ozt.) The coins are 34 mm × 2 mm and are made from a 90% gold (0.900 fine or 21.6 kt) and 10% copper alloy and have a total weight of 1.0750 troy ounces (1.1794 oz; 33.44 g).

The eagle, half eagle, and quarter eagle were defined by name in the act of Congress originally authorizing them. Likewise, the double eagle was created by the Coinage Act of 1849. Since the $20 gold piece had twice the value of the eagle, these coins were designated "double eagles". Before, the most valuable American coin was the $10 gold eagle, first produced in 1795, two years after the United States Mint opened.

The production of the first double eagle coincided with the 1849 California Gold Rush. In that year, the mint produced two pieces in proof. In 1904, President Theodore Roosevelt sought to beautify American coinage, and proposed Augustus Saint-Gaudens as an artist capable of the task. Although the sculptor had poor experiences with the Mint and its chief engraver, Charles E. Barber, Saint-Gaudens accepted Roosevelt's call. The work was subject to considerable delays, due to Saint-Gaudens's declining health and difficulties because of the high relief of his design. Saint-Gaudens died in 1907, after designing the eagle and double eagle, but before the designs were finalized for production. The new coin became known as the Saint-Gaudens double eagle. Regular production continued until 1933, when the official price of gold was changed to $35/ozt by the Gold Reserve Act.

== Regular issue ==
Regular issue double eagles come in two major types and six minor varieties as follows:

- Liberty Head (Coronet) 1849–1907
  - Liberty Head, no motto, value "TWENTY D." 1849–1866
  - Liberty Head, with motto, value "TWENTY D." 1866–1876
  - Liberty Head, with motto, value "TWENTY DOLLARS" 1877–1907
- Saint-Gaudens 1907–1933
  - Saint-Gaudens, high relief, Roman numerals, no motto 1907
  - Saint-Gaudens, low relief, Arabic numerals, no motto 1907–1908
  - Saint-Gaudens, low relief, Arabic numerals, with motto 1908–1933

=== Liberty Head ===
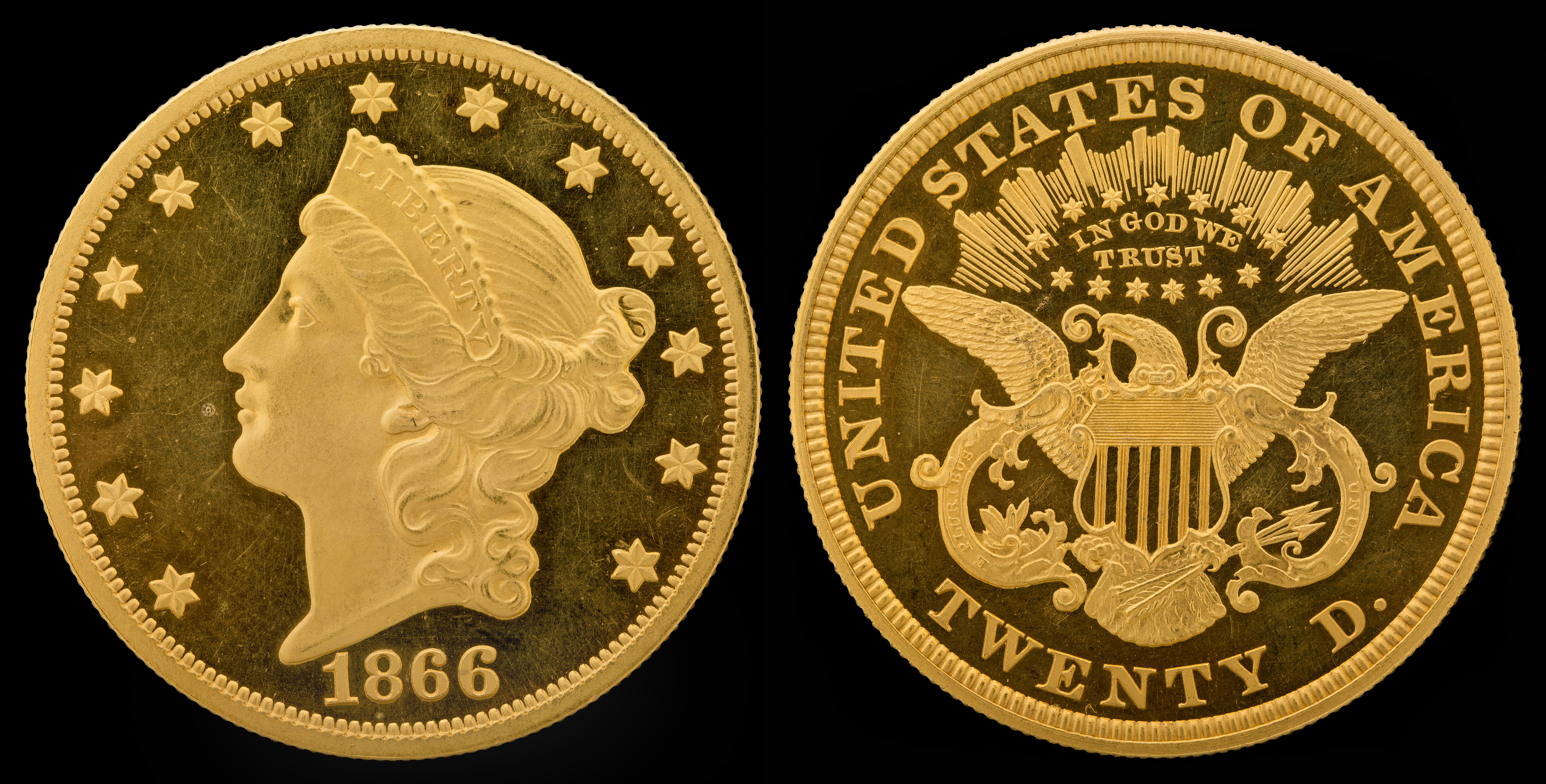
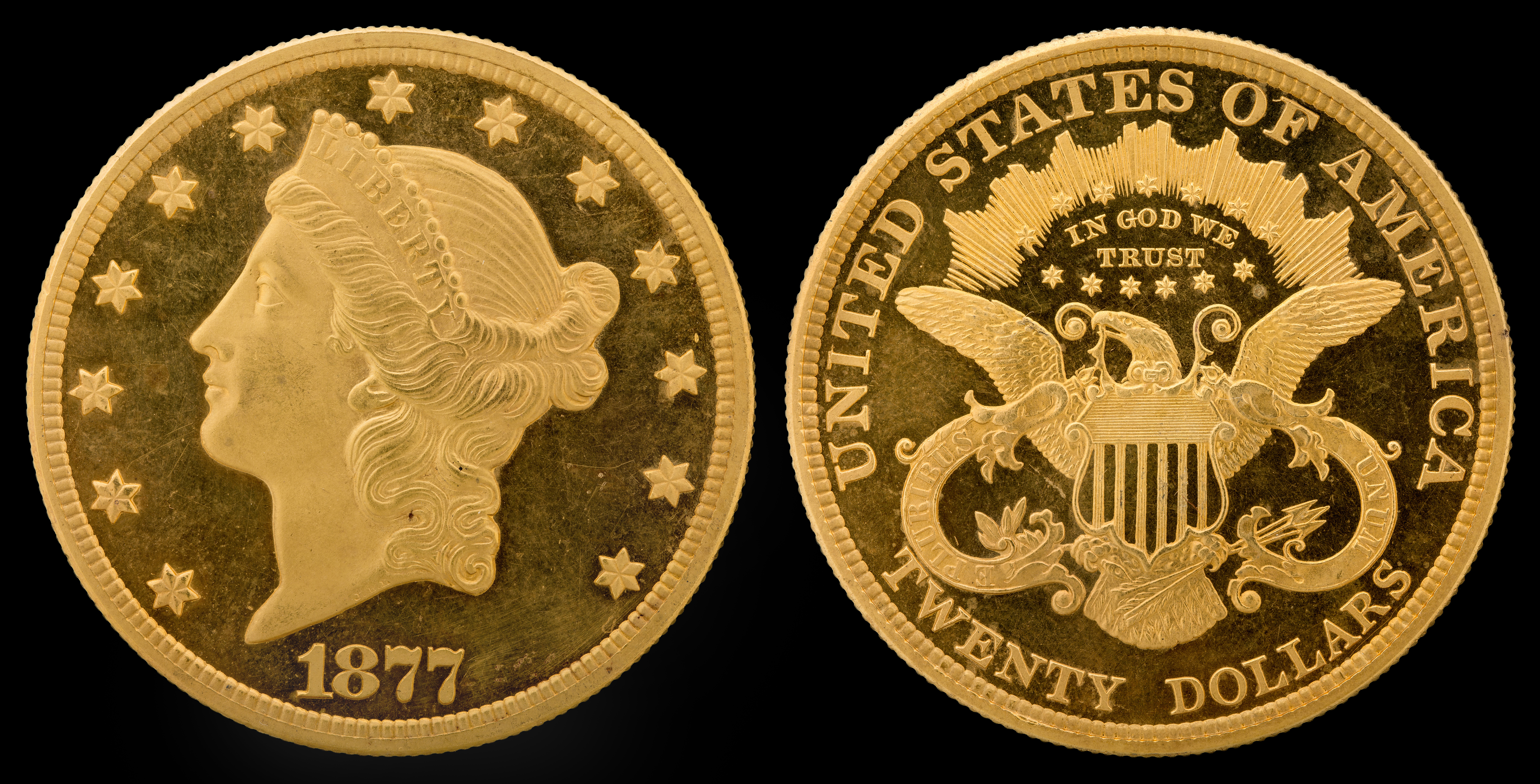
Liberty Head 1866 motto (top) and 1877 "dollars" (bottom) design changes

Due to the less desirable artwork and therefore lower demand, Liberty Head (Coronet) $20 gold pieces are less often encountered, and the common subtype commands less than the Saint-Gaudens type. In 1866, the motto "In God We Trust" was added to the double eagle, creating a second subtype. In 1877, the coin's denomination design on the reverse was changed from "TWENTY D." to "TWENTY DOLLARS" creating a third and final subtype for the series. An 1879 pattern coin was made for the quintuple Stella using a design combining features of the Liberty Head double eagle and Stella pattern coin and using the same alloy as the Stella (90 parts gold, three parts silver, and seven parts copper); this coin was stolen in July 2008.

=== Saint-Gaudens ===
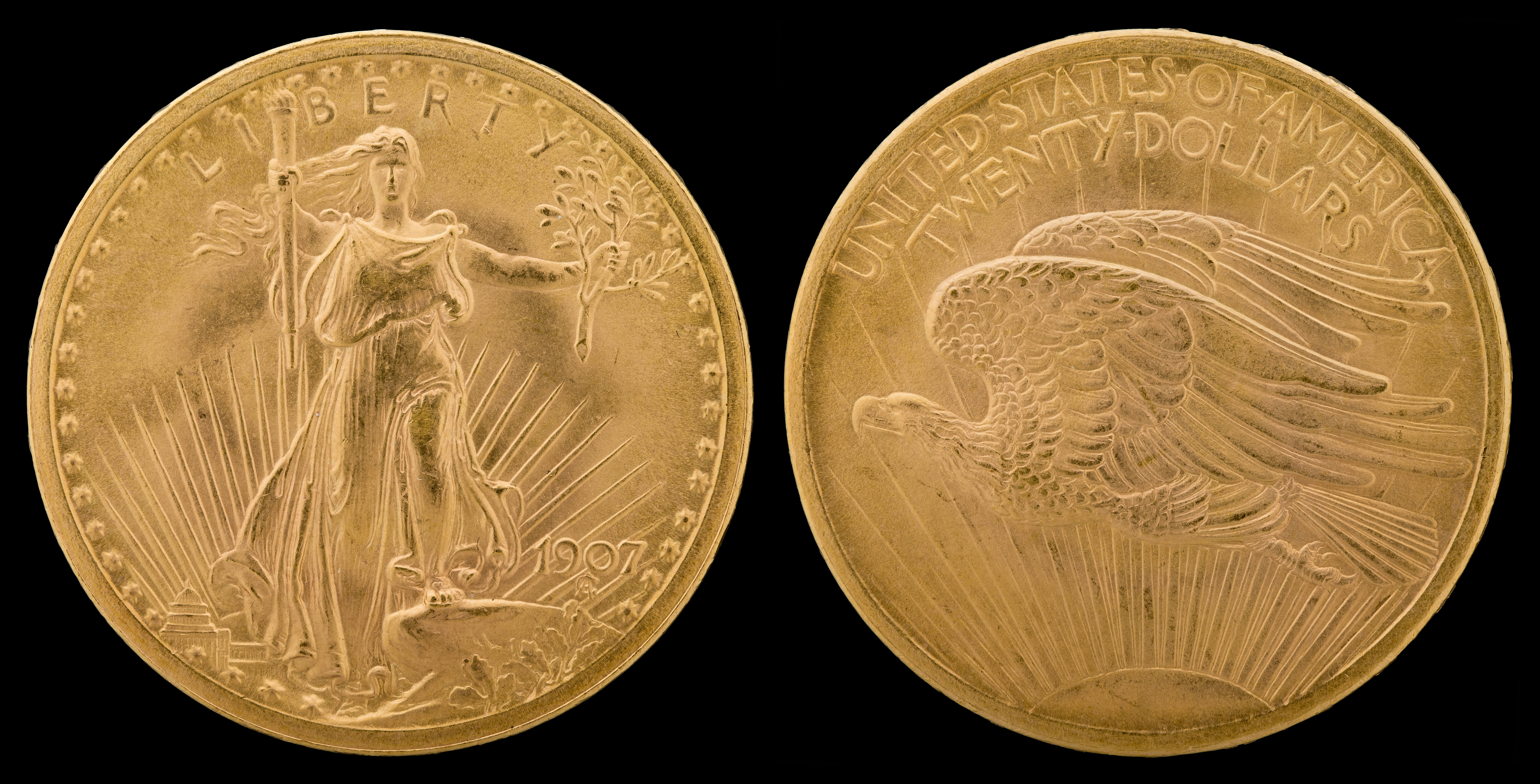
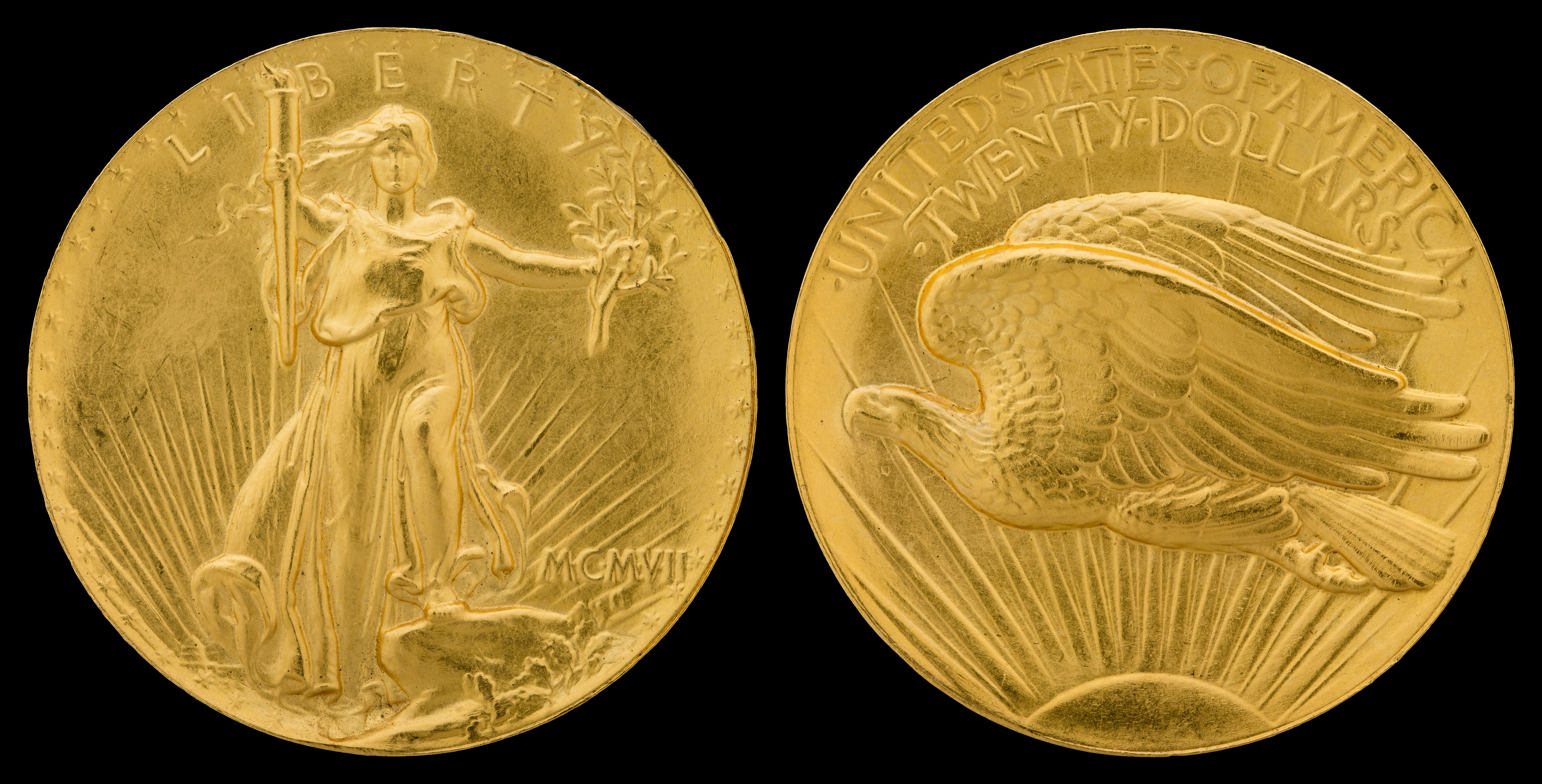
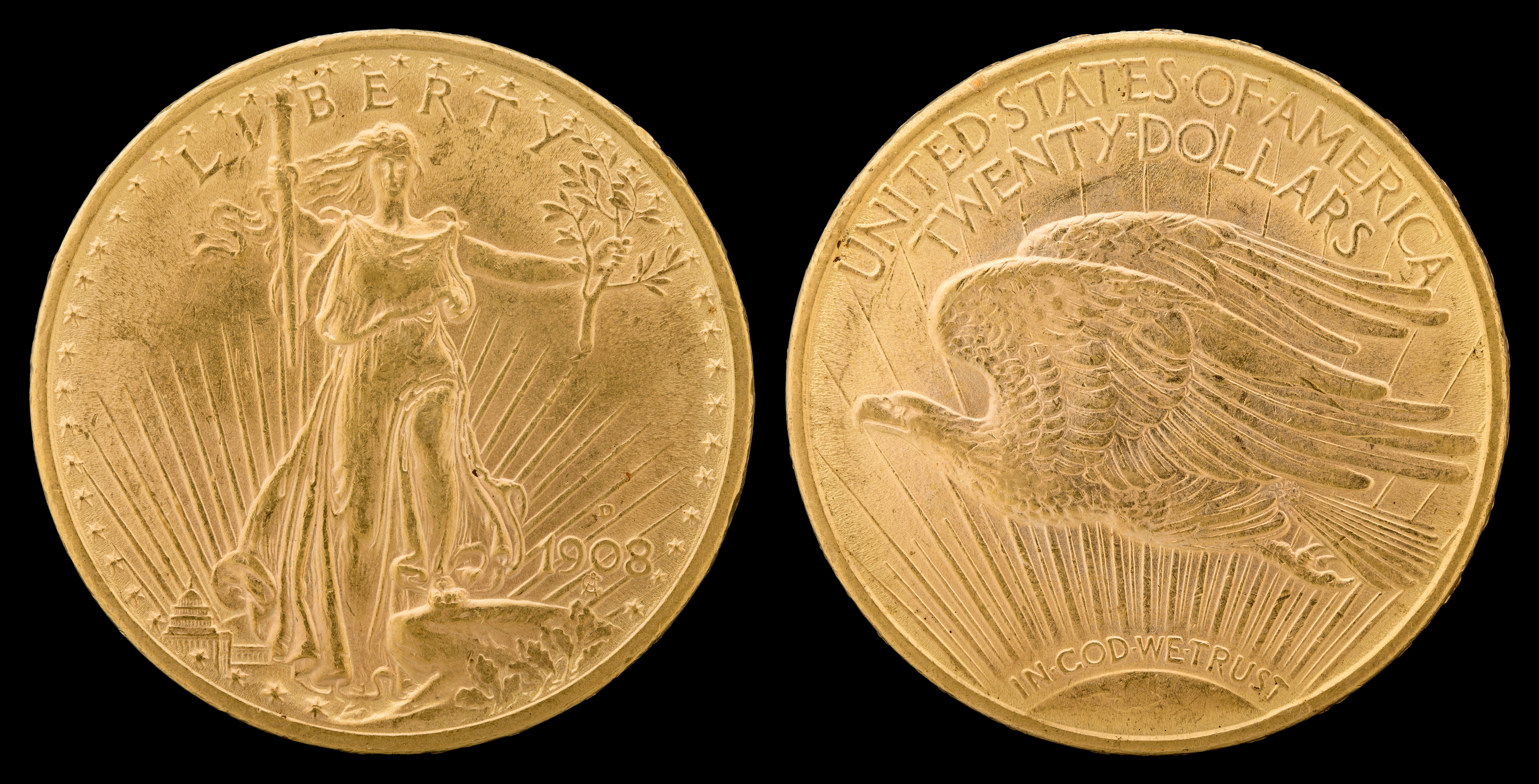
Saint-Gaudens 1907 Arabic numbers, "High relief", no motto (top), 1907 "Roman numerals, ultra high relief" (middle), 1908 Arabic numbers, motto (bottom) design changes

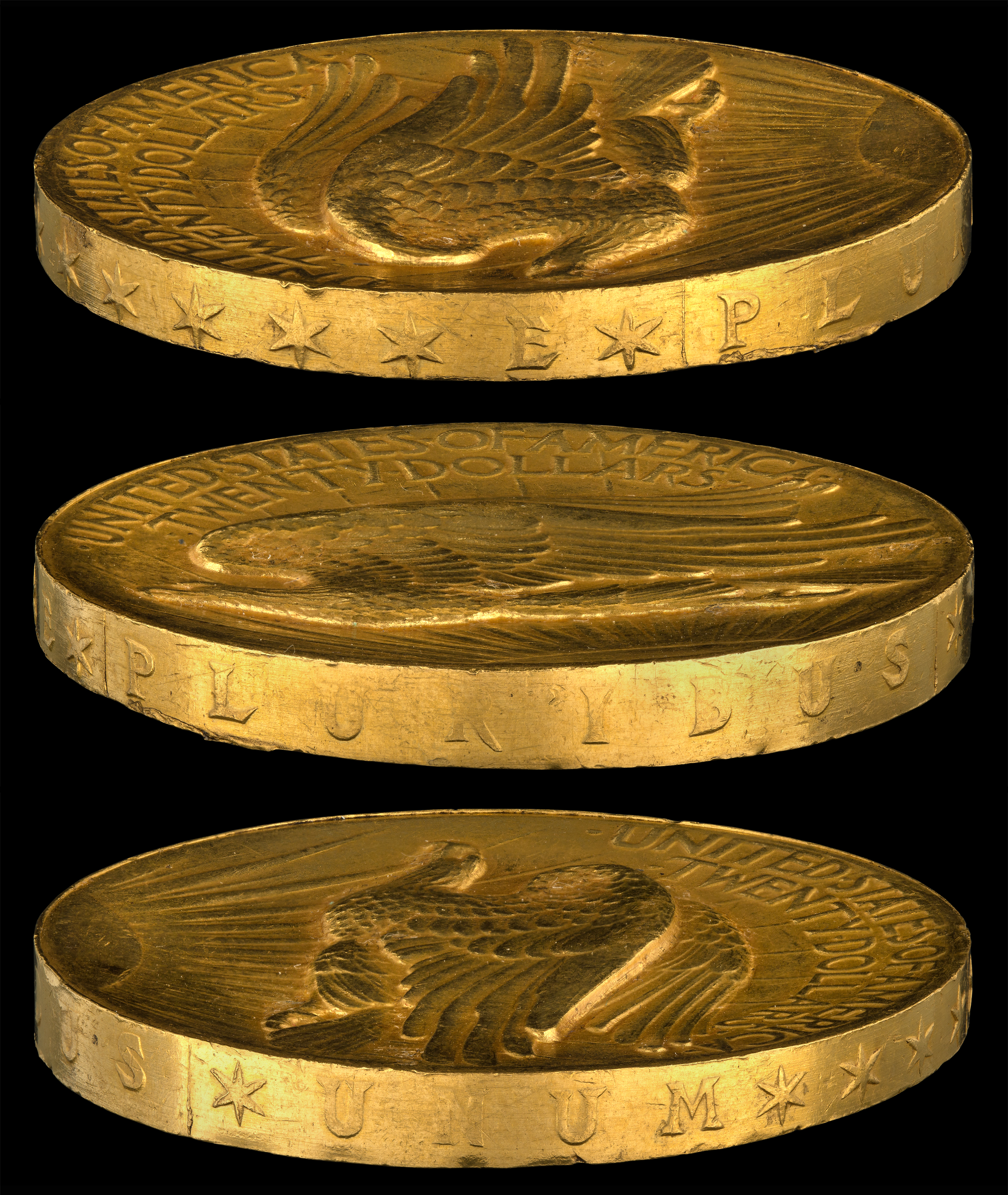
Side of the 1907 "high relief" double eagle showing edge lettering and surface detail

The Saint-Gaudens double eagle is named for the designer, Augustus Saint-Gaudens, one of the premier sculptors in American history. Theodore Roosevelt imposed upon him in his last few years to redesign the nation's coinage at the beginning of the 20th century. Saint-Gaudens' work on the high-relief $20 gold piece is considered to be one of the most extraordinary pieces of art on any American coin. The mint eventually insisted on a low-relief version, as the high-relief coin took up to eleven strikes to bring up the details which was harder for the older die presses. This high-relief also caused irregular stacking for banking purposes. Only 12,367 of these coins were struck in 1907. These coins easily top the $10,000 price in circulated grades, but can reach nearly a half million dollars in the best states of preservation.

There were several changes in the early years of this design. The first coins issued in 1907 design featured a date in Roman numerals, but this was changed later that year to the more convenient Arabic numerals. The motto "In God We Trust" was omitted from the initial design, as Roosevelt felt that putting the name of God on money that could be used for immoral purposes was inappropriate. By act of Congress, the motto was added in mid-1908.

The design of the Saint-Gaudens coin was slightly changed once more when New Mexico and Arizona became states in 1912, and the number of stars along the rim was accordingly increased from 46 to 48.

Double eagles were routinely minted through 1933, although few of the very last years' coinages were released before the gold recall legislation of that year. Accordingly, these issues (when the U.S. Treasury permits individuals to own them) bring very high prices.

The Saint-Gaudens obverse design was reused in the American eagle gold bullion coins that were instituted in 1986. The early 1907 double eagles and the 1986–1991 gold American eagles are the only instances of Roman numerals denoting the date on American coinage. The 2009 ultra-high relief American Eagle also used Roman numerals.

On January 22, 2009, the U.S. Mint released ultra-high relief double eagles using the deep design that Saint-Gaudens envisioned, so that the U.S. Mint could, as its web site states "fulfill Augustus Saint-Gaudens' vision of an ultra high relief coin that could not be realized in 1907 with his legendary Double Eagle liberty design." Despite that claim, however, the mint actually reaffirmed just what doomed the first attempts in 1907. The coin's highly abradable 0.9999 fine gold composition and the multiple strikes required to bring up the design are not practical for business strikes. Because of their higher gold content, and greater striking pressure, the coins are 27 mm wide and 4 mm deep (the same diameter as a gold eagle), rather than the 34 mm × 2 mm that had been established for U.S. $20 gold coins. The initial selling price was $1239. With the rising price of gold by June it had climbed to $1339, and by December to $1489. There was no limit on the coinage of these one time uncirculated issues, which bear the date "MMIX". In September, the one coin per person ordering restriction was removed. The final mintage was 115,178. These coins were minted at the West Point Mint, but none of them bear the "W" mint mark, making them particularly unusual.

== 1933 double eagle ==
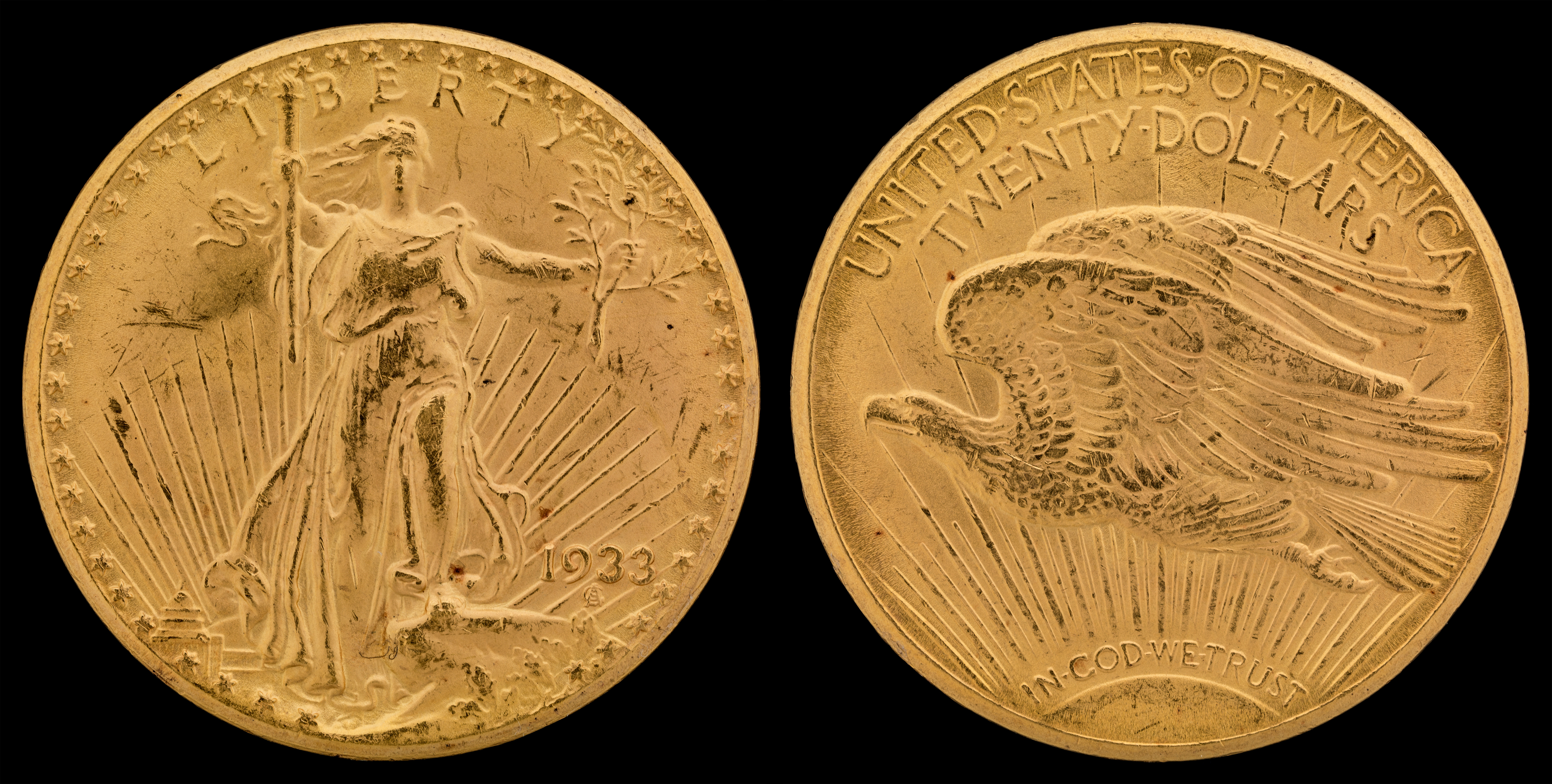
The Smithsonian specimen of the 1933 Saint-Gaudens double eagle

In 1933, President Franklin D. Roosevelt stopped the coinage of gold and made it illegal to own the metal (although coin collectors could retain their pieces). With one exception, no 1933 double eagles were ever legally released, although some were stolen from the government, and over the years several were recovered.

In the summer of 2002, a 1933 double eagle was auctioned off for US$7,590,020 which shattered the old record of $4,140,000 paid at a public auction for an 1804 silver dollar. This piece is unique as the only 1933 double eagle the U.S. government has deemed legal for its citizens to own (having been negotiated as such through terms of a U.S. treaty with a foreign government). Even illegal instances of the 1933 double eagle could be worth hundreds of thousands of dollars, but it would be illegal for a U.S. coin dealer to broker a deal with one of these coins. There is no other date of Saint-Gaudens double eagle that is worth a significant fraction of this extraordinary coin. A complete uncirculated set of all other Saint-Gaudens double eagles could be put together for just over three million dollars (less than half the price paid for the 1933), including the extremely rare, ultra-high relief, proof pattern. Without the rare pattern, the set would be less than $750,000.

In August 2005, the United States Mint recovered ten 1933 double eagle coins from a private collector who had contacted the United States Mint to ascertain their authenticity. Joan S. Langbord claimed that she inherited the coins from her father, a suspect in their original theft in 1933, and had found them in a safe deposit box in 2003. The Mint announced that it would consider saving the coins for display. Meanwhile, Langbord filed a federal suit to recover the coins after her hopes of receiving monetary compensation from the federal government were not realized. In September 2009, a federal judge ruled that the government had until the end of the month to return the confiscated coins to the Langbord family, or to prove that they had indeed been stolen. On July 20, 2011, a civil-court jury awarded ownership of the ten coins to the U.S. government on grounds that the coins were stolen from the Mint. However, on April 17, 2015, the United States Court of Appeals for the Third Circuit in Philadelphia overturned the jury's decision and ruled that the ten 1933 double eagles did indeed belong to Joan S. Langbord and that they must be returned to her family by the U.S. Mint. The appeals court returned the coins to the Langbords because U.S. officials had not responded within a 90-day limit to the family's seized-property claim. On August 1, 2016, the full appeals court reversed its earlier ruling and allowed the government to keep the coins.

== Quintuple Stella ==
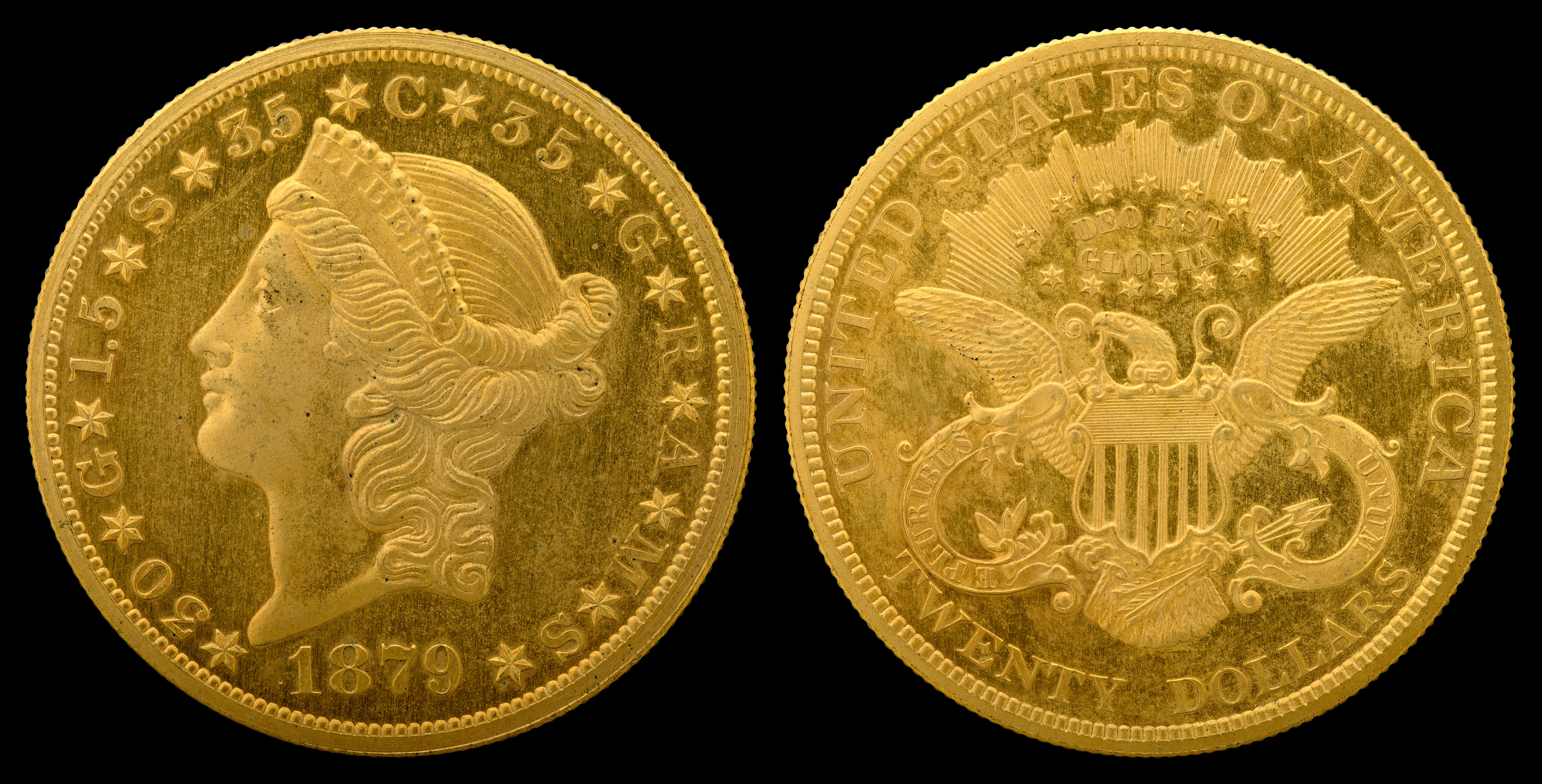
Quintuple Stella pattern

In response to international monetary conferences held in Europe, the United States Mint struck patterns of various gold coins for use as an international currency in the late 1870s and early 1880s. The double eagle was one such coin, struck with a modified Liberty Head design featuring "★30★G★1.5★S★3.5★C★35★G★R★A★M★S★" on the obverse in 1879, similar to the Stella pattern. Five of the resulting "Quintuple Stella" coins are known to exist in gold, plus about a dozen in copper, some of which have been plated in gold. The period in the "3.5" was omitted in error on the first copper coin struck.

== Known specimens ==
In 1849 the mint produced two pieces in proof. The first now resides in the Smithsonian Institution in Washington, D.C. The second was presented to Treasury Secretary William M. Meredith and was later sold as part of his estate—the present location of this coin remains unknown.

The 1933 double eagle is among the most valuable of U.S. coins, with the sole example currently known to be in private hands–the King Farouk specimen, which was purchased by King Farouk of Egypt in 1944–selling in 2002 for $7,590,020 and resold to an unknown buyer in 2021 for $18.8 million. Twelve other specimens exist, two of which are held in the National Numismatic Collection and the United States Bullion Depository at Fort Knox.

In July 2023, over 700 gold coins dated from 1840 to 1863, including Double Eagles, were unearthed at a corn field in Kentucky, dubbed the Great Kentucky Hoard. Finder and location remain anonymous.

The 1897-S Double Eagle $20 coin (MS67 PCGS CAC specimen) was sold at Heritage Auctions for a record breaking price of $390,400 in September 2026.

== See also ==
- 20 yen coin
- Double sovereign
- Commemorative coin
- Gold as an investment
