= Yoy =

Yoy, yoy, or YoY may refer to:

- Yoy people, an ethnic group in Southeast Asia
- Yoy language, an ISO 639-3 code

== See also ==
- Year-on-year inflation-indexed swap, a standard derivative product
