= Inflation derivative =

Economics concept

In finance, inflation derivative (or inflation-indexed derivatives) refers to an over-the-counter and exchange-traded derivative that is used to transfer inflation risk from one counterparty to another. See Exotic derivative.

== Derivative ==
Typically, real rate swaps also come under this bracket, such as asset swaps of inflation-indexed bonds (government-issued inflation-indexed bonds, such as the Treasury Inflation Protected Securities, UK inflation-linked gilt-edged securities (ILGs), French OATeis, Italian BTPeis, German Bundeis and Japanese JGBis are prominent examples). Inflation swaps are the linear form of these derivatives. They can take a similar form to fixed versus floating interest rate swaps (which are the derivative form for fixed rate bonds), but use a real rate coupon versus floating, but also pay a redemption pickup at maturity (i.e., the derivative form of inflation-indexed bonds).

Inflation swaps are typically priced on a zero-coupon basis (ZC) (like ZCIIS for example), with payment exchanged at the end of the term. One party pays the compounded fixed rate and the other the actual inflation rate for the term. Inflation swaps can also be paid on a year-on-year basis (YOY) (like YYIIS for example) where the year-on-year rate of change of the price index is paid, typically yearly as in the case of most European YOY swaps, but also monthly for many swapped notes in the US market. Even though the coupons are paid monthly, the inflation rate used is still the year-on-year rate.

Options on inflation including interest rate cap and floors and straddles can also be traded. These are typically priced against YOY swaps, whilst the swaption is priced on the ZC curve.

Asset swaps also exist where the coupon payment of the linker (inflation bond) as well as the redemption pickup at maturity is exchanged for interest rate payments expressed as a premium or discount to LIBOR for the relevant bond coupon period, all dates are co-terminus. The redemption pickup is the above par redemption value in the case of par/par asset swaps, or the redemption above the proceeds notional in the case of the proceeds asset swap. The proceeds notional equals the dirty nominal price of the bond at the time of purchase and is used as the fixed notional on the LIBOR leg.

Real rate swaps are the nominal interest swap rate minus the corresponding inflation swap. As for modelling, the trend has been either to provide:

- a model describing at the same time, nominal rates, real rates and inflation and representing the inflation as the exchange rate between nominal and real rates. The first type of model along these lines has been the one of Jarrow and Yildirim.
- a market model that represents the inflation like a real asset and uses similar ideas as the one of BGM to represent the inflation returns. The first type of model along these lines has been the one of Belgrade, Benhamou, Koehler that is commercially available in Pricing Partners modelling suite. Another more advanced version has been the one of Fabio Mercurio and Nicola Moreni.
