= 20 yen coin =

Gold-minted coin

Twenty yen
- Japan
- Value: 20 Japanese yen
- Mass: Varies by date g
- Diameter: Varies by date mm
- Edge: Reeded
- Shape: Circular
- Composition: 90% Gold; 10% Copper
- Years of minting: 1870–1932
- Catalog number: Y13, Y-34, Y-40.2, & Y52

Obverse

Reverse

The 20 yen coin (二十圓硬貨) is a former denomination of the Japanese yen. These coins were minted in gold, and during their lifespan were the highest denomination of coin that circulated in the country. The first coins were minted in 1870 following the introduction of a decimal currency system. Twenty Yen coins spanned three different Imperial eras before mintage was halted in 1932. Many of these coins were melted down as a result of the wars between 1931 and 1945. These coins no longer circulate, and are instead collected as items of numismatic value, or as investments for their gold content.

== History ==
In November 1869, new units of yen were established in the form of a metric system. During this time it was decided that silver would become the standard unit of value leaving gold coinage as a subsidiary. The Japanese government considered adopting the gold standard as early as December 1870 after hearing about its implementation in the United States. This system was officially put into place on May 10, 1871, setting standards for the 20 yen coin. Gold coinage eventually ground to a halt within a few years as coinage regulations that had been put into place were not sufficient to maintain a healthy growth of gold monometallism. This was in part due to the issuance of large amounts of in-convertible paper currency which drove gold coins out of the country. Coinage of the 20 yen piece had all but stopped by 1877, and those struck in 1880 were only done so as part of presentation sets for visiting dignitaries and heads of state.

New coinage reform was adopted on March 26, 1897, which re-established the gold 20 yen coin. These new standards lowered both the size and weight of the coin, the new diameter was set at 28.78mm (previously 35.06mm), and the weight was lowered from 33.3g down to 16.6g. Over 1.5 million coins were struck during this year before production ceased until 1904. (Note: 1903 (year 36) dated coins are not mentioned in annual coinage reports.) Coinage of 20 yen pieces then continued past the reign of Emperor Meiji, into the reign of Emperor Taishō where coinage stopped in 1920. The decision to stop minting 20 yen pieces came as Japan's gold reserves were quickly depleted from excess imports. These reserves were eventually stabilized and coinage started again in 1930. By this time though, the gold coins minted were described as "not in general use".

This resumed coinage was brief under Emperor Shōwa as Japan abandoned the gold standard in December 1931. The reasons behind this move were that Japan's gold reserves were again being depleted, and allowing the yen to depreciate would help the economy which was struggling at the time. Gold coins of the 20 yen denomination were last minted in 1932, it is unknown how many Shōwa era coins were later melted. Some of these coins were kept away in bank vaults for decades before being released as part of a hoard in the mid-2000s.

== Weight and size ==
Image	Minted	Size	Weight
	1870–1880	35.06mm	33.33g (Note: These coins were legally allowed to weigh anywhere from 33.30 to 33.36 grams each (converted from grains).)
	1897–1932	28.78mm	16.66g (Note: The legal limit of weight deviation was 0.0324 grams per piece. This means that 20 yen coins could legally weigh anywhere from 16.62 to 16.69 grams each.)

== Circulation figures ==
=== Meiji ===
The following are mintage figures for the coins that were minted between the 3rd and 45th (last) year of Meiji's reign. Inscriptions on coins for this period all begin with the Japanese symbol 明治 (Meiji). While coins were struck in 1892, none were released for circulation.

Japanese coins from this period are read clockwise from right to left

"Year" ← "Number representing year of reign" ← "Emperors name" (Ex: 年 ← 七十三 ← 治明)

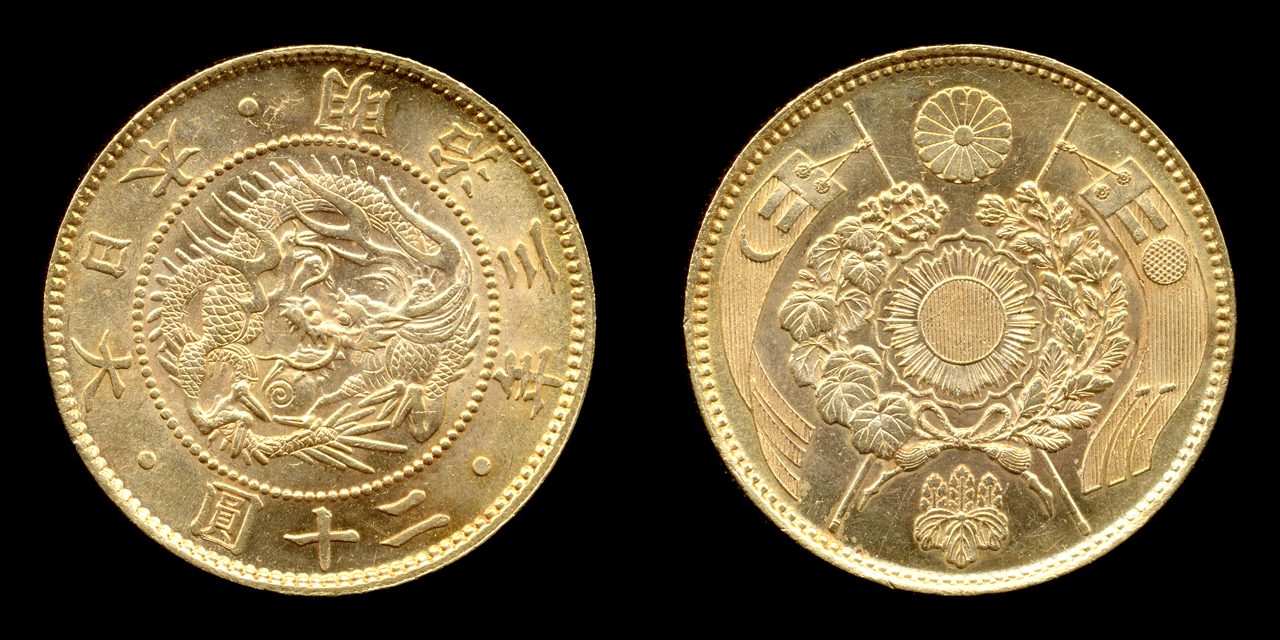
20 yen coin from 1870 (year 3) Design 1 - (1870 - 1892)

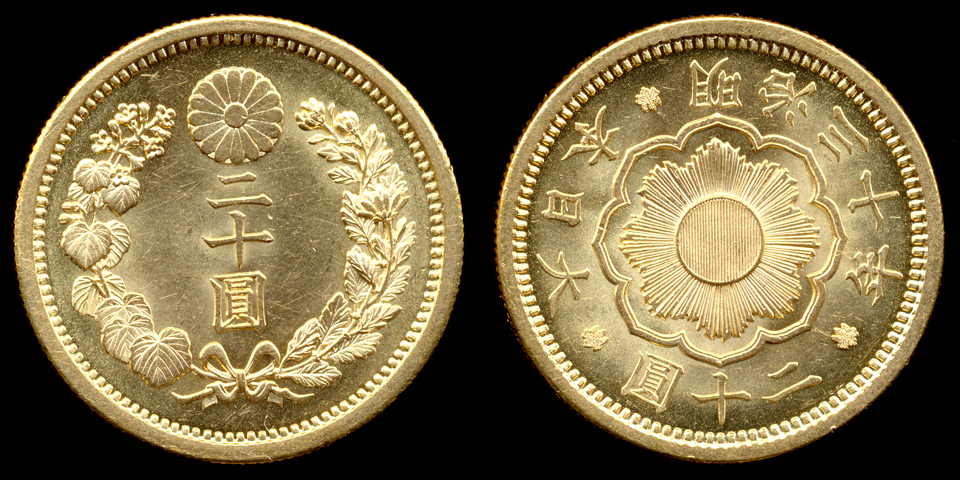
20 yen coin from 1897 (year 30) Design 2 - (1897 - 1912) (Note: The 2nd design was used until the series ended in 1932.)

Year of reign	Japanese date	Gregorian date	Mintage
3rd	三	1870	46,139
5th	五	1872	42,845
6th	六	1873	3,251
9th	九	1876	954
10th	十	1877	29
13th	三十	1880	103
25th	五十二	1892	Not circulated (Note: Several unique coins dated 1892 are known to have been produced to display at the World's Columbian Exposition. While there are no known existing examples of twenty yen coins dated 1892 (year 25), they are mentioned by Krause Publications.)
30th	十三	1897	1,861,000
37th	七十三	1904	2,759,470
38th	八十三	1905	1,045,904
39th	九十三	1906	1,331,332
40th	十四	1907	817,363
41st	一十四	1908	458,082
42nd	二十四	1909	557,882
43rd	三十四	1910	2,163,644
44th	四十四	1911	1,470,057
45th	五十四	1912	1,272,450

=== Taishō ===
The following are mintage figures for the coins that were minted from the 1st to the 9th year of Taishō's reign. Inscriptions on coins for this period all begin with the Japanese symbol 大正 (Taishō).

Japanese coins from this period are read clockwise from right to left:

"Year" ← "Number representing year of reign" ← "Emperors name" (Ex: 年 ← 六 ← 正大)

Year of reign	Japanese date	Gregorian date	Mintage
1st	元	1912	177,644
2nd	二	1913	869,248
3rd	三	1914	1,042,890
4th	四	1915	1,509,960
5th	五	1916	2,376,641
6th	六	1917 (Note: 5 pieces were struck in platinum sometime in the 1950s for reasons unknown.)	6,208,885
7th	七	1918	3,118,647
8th	八	1919	1,531,217
9th	九	1920	370,366

=== Shōwa ===
The following are mintage figures for coins minted between the 5th and the 7th year of Emperor Shōwa's reign. Inscriptions on coins of this period all begin with the Japanese symbol 昭和 (Shōwa).

Japanese coins from this period are read clockwise from right to left:

"Year" ← "Number representing year of reign" ← "Emperors name" (Ex: 年 ← 五 ← 和昭)

Year of reign	Japanese date	Gregorian date	Mintage
5th	五	1930	11,055,500
6th	六	1931	7,526,476
7th	七	1932	Unknown

== Collecting ==
The value of any given coin is determined by survivability rate and condition as collectors in general prefer uncleaned appealing coins. For this denomination all 20 yen coins are scarce as the amount remaining today are dependent on how many were saved or kept away. Early Meiji era coins with the first design are now considered rare due to their low mintages. These coins which are dated from 1870 to 1876 (year 3 to 9) are all priced in five digit dollar amounts (USD) in average condition. The rarest of these early coins are dated 1877 and 1880 (year 10 to 13) as one has an extremely low mintage, while the other was not meant for general circulation. Twenty yen coins dated 1877 (year 10) have an extremely low mintage of just 29 coins struck. Of those available to collectors just 1 mint state example is recorded by PCGS. Coins dated 1880 (year 13) were only released as part of presentation sets (Note: Low mintage 1880 (year 13) dated denominations include: "1 rin", "5 sen", "10 sen", 20 sen", 50 sen", "1 yen" (gold), "2 yen", "10 yen" and "20 yen" coins.) that were widely destroyed or melted down between 1931 and 1945. An auction held in 2011 featuring one of these coins sold it for $230,000 (USD). Less than 10 coins dated 1880 (year 13) of the original mintage of 103 are thought to exist today.

Millions of minted coins were recorded during the Shōwa era, but it is unclear how many of these coins survived. Examples from Shōwa's 7th year of reign (1932) were once considered to be virtually unknown until a hoard was discovered in the mid-2000s. Between 2005 and 2007 the Ministry of Finance released over 30,000 gold coins of 5, 10 and 20 Yen denominations that had been kept in vaults. It is recommended by those in the numismatic field that all 20 yen coins be authenticated first by an expert, as counterfeits exist. In countries such as the United States it is illegal to import or sell imitation coins without the word "COPY" clearly marked. (15 U.S.C. ch. 48)

== See also ==
- Double eagle, American gold coin with a face value of 20 dollars
- Gold coin
- Gold as an investment
