= Zero-coupon inflation swap =

Standard derivative product

A zero-coupon inflation swap (ZCIS), also called a zero-coupon inflation-indexed swap (ZCIIS), is a standard derivative product whose payoff depends on the inflation rate realized over a given period of time. The underlying asset is a single consumer price index (CPI).

It is zero-coupon because there is only one cash flow at the maturity of the swap, without any intermediate coupon. It is called a swap because at maturity, one counterparty pays a fixed amount to the other in exchange for a floating amount (in this case linked to inflation). The final cash flow will therefore consist of the difference between the fixed amount and the value of the floating amount at expiry of the swap.

== Detailed flows ==
- At time $T_M$ = M years
  - Party B pays Party A the fixed amount $N[(1 + K)^M - 1]$
  - Party A pays Party B the floating amount $N\Bigg[\frac{\mathcal{I}(T_M)}{\mathcal{I}(T_0)} - 1\Bigg]$

where:

- $K$ is the contract fixed rate
- $N$ the contract nominal value
- $M$ the number of years
- $T_0$ is the start date
- $T_M$ is the maturity date (end of the swap)
- $\mathcal{I}(T_0)$ is the inflation consumer price index at start date (time $T_0$)
- $\mathcal{I}(T_M)$ is the inflation consumer price index at maturity date (time $T_M$)

== See also ==
- Year-on-Year Inflation-Indexed Swap (YYIIS)
