= Australian Silver Kangaroo =

Silver coin minted in Canberra, Australia

Silver Kangaroo
- Australia
- Value: 1 AUS
- Mass: (1 troy oz)
- Diameter: 40.60 mm
- Edge: Reeded
- Composition: 99.99% Ag
- Years of minting: 1993–present

Obverse
- Design: Queen Elizabeth II
- Designer: Raphael Maklouf
- Design date: 1993

Reverse
- 2017
- Design: Kangaroo
- Designer: Horst Hahne
- Design date: 1993

The Australian Silver Kangaroo is a one troy ounce silver bullion coin minted by the Royal Australian Mint in Canberra, Australia. They have legal tender status in Australia.

The Silver Kangaroo series was introduced in 1993. Silver Kangaroo coins are usually issued in two forms: a proof coin and a frosted uncirculated coin, although coins with selective gold plating have also been issued from 2003.

The purity of the coin was 99.9% until 2014, then it was increased to 99.99% from 2015.

== See also ==
- Bullion
- Bullion coin
- Inflation hedge
- Types of Silver Coins
