= Gold Bullion Coin Act of 1985 =

- Long title: An Act to authorize the minting of gold bullion coins.
- Acronyms (colloquial): GBCA
- Enacted by: the 99th United States Congress
- Effective: December 17, 1985

Citations
- Public law: 99-185
- Statutes at Large: 99 Stat. 1177

Codification
- Titles amended: 31 U.S.C.: Money and Finance
- U.S.C. sections amended: 31 U.S.C. ch. 51, subch. II §§ 5112, 5116, 5118; 31 U.S.C. ch. 51, subch. III § 5132

Legislative history
- Introduced in the Senate as S. 1639 by J. James Exon (D–NE) on September 12, 1985; Committee consideration by Senate Banking, Housing, and Urban Affairs; Passed the Senate on November 14, 1985 (Passed voice vote); Passed the House on December 2, 1985 (Passed voice vote); Signed into law by President Ronald Reagan on December 17, 1985

The Gold Bullion Coin Act of 1985, Pub. L. No. 99-185, 99 Stat. 1177 (Dec. 17, 1985), codified at 31 U.S.C. § 5112(a)(7) through (a)(10), 31 U.S.C. § 5112(i), 31 U.S.C. § 5116(a)(3), and amending 31 U.S.C. § 5118(d) and 31 U.S.C. § 5132(a)(1), has helped the American Gold Eagle to quickly become one of the world's leaders in gold bullion coin. Produced from gold mined in the United States, American Eagles are imprinted with their gold content and legal tender face value.

The act was passed by United States Congress pursuant to its exclusive power to coin money and set its value, set forth in Article I, Section 8, Clause 5 of the United States Constitution. It was signed by Ronald Reagan on December 17, 1985. One requirement is that all gold used in minting the coins would be from "newly mined domestic sources".

== Gold coins as legal tender ==
The case of Ling Su Fan v. United States, 218 U.S. 302 (1910), establishes the legal distinction of a coin bearing the "impress" of the sovereign:

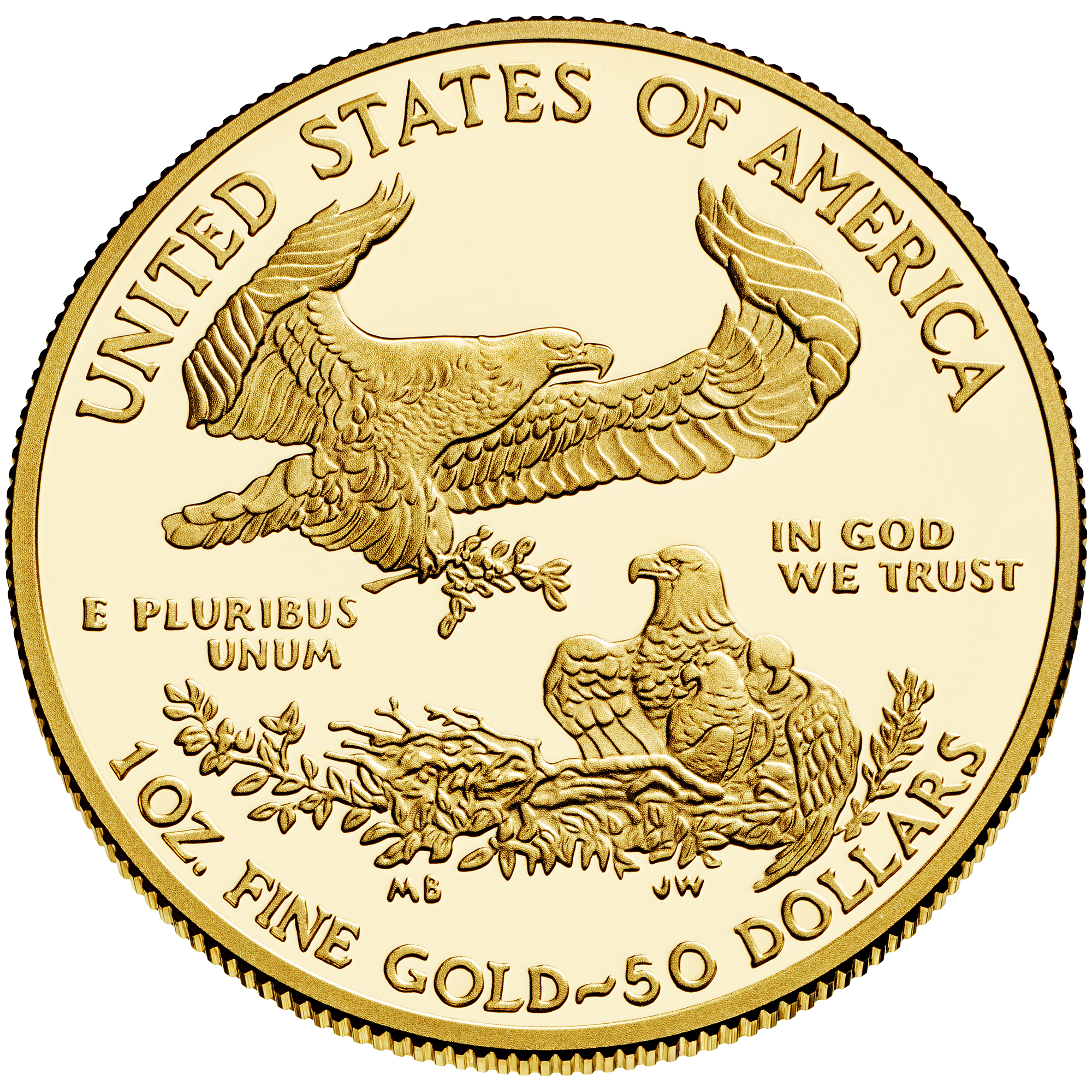
United States gold bullion coin with engraved Bald Eagle

These limitations are due to the fact that public law gives to such coinage a value which does not attach as a mere consequence of intrinsic value. Their quality as a legal tender is an attribute of law aside from their bullion value. They bear, therefore, the impress of sovereign power which fixes value and authorizes their use in exchange.

The case of Thompson v. Butler, 95 U.S. 694 (1877), establishes that the law makes no legal distinction between the values of coin and paper money used as legal tender:

A coin dollar is worth no more for the purposes of tender in payment of an ordinary debt than a note dollar. The law has not made the note a standard of value any more than coin. It is true that in the market, as an article of merchandise, one is of greater value than the other; but as money, that is to say, as a medium of exchange, the law knows no difference between them.
