= Year-on-year inflation-indexed swap =

Standard derivative product

A year-on-year inflation-indexed swap (YYIIS) is a standard derivative product over inflation rate. The underlying is a single consumer price index (CPI). The first swap of this kind was traded through the inter-dealer broker network in November 1999.

It is called a swap because each year there is a swap of a fixed amount against a floating amount, although in practice only a one way payment is made (fixed amount – floating amount).

== Detailed flows ==
- Each year, at time $T_i$
  - Party B pays Party A the fixed amount $N{\phi_i}K$
  - Party A pays Party B the floating amount $N{\psi_i}[\frac{I(T_i)}{I(T_{i-1})} - 1]$

where:

- K is the contract fixed rate
- N the contract nominal value
- M the number of years corresponding to the deal maturity
- i the number of years (0 < i <= M)
- $\phi_i$ is the fixed-leg year fractions for the interval [Ti−1, Ti]
- $\psi_i$ is the floating-leg year fractions for the interval [Ti−1, Ti]
- $T_0$ is the start date
- $T_i$ is the time of the flow i
- $T_M$ is the maturity date (end of the swap)
- $I(T_0)$ is the inflation at start date (time $T_0$)
- $I(T_i)$ is the inflation at time of the flow i (time $T_i$)
- $I(T_M)$ is the inflation at maturity date (time $T_M$)

== See also ==
- Zero-Coupon Inflation-Indexed Swap (ZCIIS)
