= Inflation-indexed bond =

Bonds whose cash flows are indexed to inflation

Inflation-indexed bond is a debt security whose cash flows are linked to a published price index so that the value of principal, and often the coupon, adjusts for inflation. The instrument is also called an inflation-linked bond or a linker. Designs vary by market. Examples include Treasury Inflation-Protected Securities in the United States and Index-linked gilts in the United Kingdom. Programmes differ in the reference index, the indexation lag and whether a deflation floor at par applies. These choices affect valuation, taxation and the degree of basis risk for holders whose personal inflation may differ from the reference index.

A common summary measure derived from these bonds is Breakeven inflation, which compares the yield on a nominal bond with the yield on a similar inflation-indexed bond. Breakevens are informative about expected inflation in the relevant market and horizon, although they can also reflect risk premia and liquidity premia. Investors use inflation-indexed bonds to preserve purchasing power, to match indexed liabilities and to diversify portfolios alongside nominal bonds, equities and other assets.

== History and policy rationale ==
Early examples of indexation go back centuries. Research notes an indexed bond issued by the Commonwealth of Massachusetts in 1780 and Finland’s sovereign issuance in 1945. In emerging markets, Israel began issuing CPI-linked government bonds in 1955 and Chile followed in 1956, as governments facing high and volatile inflation sought domestic currency funding at medium-term maturities.

Among advanced economies, the United Kingdom launched index-linked gilts in 1981. Other developed programmes followed during the 1980s and 1990s, including Australia, Sweden and New Zealand, with the United States auctioning the first TIPS in January 1997 and France issuing the first OATi in 1998. Japan introduced ten-year JGBi in 2004 and has issued them in two distinct periods since then.

Programme designs and policies continue to evolve. Canada ceased new Real Return Bond issuance in 2022 and Germany announced in 2024 that no further inflation-linked federal securities would be issued or reopened, while outstanding bonds continue to trade. In the United Kingdom, the Government and the UK Statistics Authority decided in 2020 that RPI methodology will be aligned with CPIH from 2030, with both indices continuing to be published.

Policy motivations cited by treasuries and international institutions include reducing the inflation risk premium embedded in nominal debt, widening the investor base, supplying a real risk-free asset for long-horizon savers and providing market-based indicators of inflation compensation that inform economic analysis and communications.

== Mechanics and design ==
An inflation-indexed bond links cash flows to a published price index by applying an index ratio to the principal and, in many markets, to the coupon. In the United States, Treasury Inflation-Protected Securities reference the CPI-U on a non-seasonally adjusted basis and use a three-month indexation lag with a daily index ratio; most issues include a principal floor at par that protects against cumulative deflation. In the United Kingdom, Index-linked gilt design has changed over time and new gilts launched from 2005 use a shorter three-month lag rather than the older eight-month lag, with the Debt Management Office publishing the methodology and daily index ratios. Programmes in other sovereign markets adopt different reference indices, lags and indexation conventions, which affects valuation, taxation and the degree of basis risk for holders.

In the United Kingdom, new index-linked gilts use a three-month lag and reference the RPI. The Government and the UK Statistics Authority decided in 2020 that RPI methodology will be aligned with CPIH from 2030, with both indices continuing to be published.

== Pricing and market-implied inflation ==
A common summary measure is Breakeven inflation, computed as the yield on a nominal government bond minus the real yield on a similar inflation-indexed bond of the same maturity. Central banks and researchers also fit real and nominal term structures to produce daily curves and breakeven series.

Breakevens are informative about expected inflation, yet they are not a pure measure of expectations. Research shows that the yield difference embeds compensation for inflation risk and for relative liquidity, and that these premia vary over time with regimes and market conditions. Liquidity studies document that trading depth in inflation-indexed bonds is typically lower than in comparable nominals, which can move breakevens around supply events and periods of balance-sheet stress.

Short-horizon readings can also be affected by technical features. The indexation lag and CPI seasonality create carry that changes through the year, especially at the front of the curve. The presence of a principal floor against cumulative deflation gives inflation-indexed bonds an embedded option whose value depends on inflation and real-rate uncertainty. Differences in reference indices and methodologies across countries require care when comparing breakevens internationally. For example, the United Kingdom references RPI for legacy gilts and has announced that RPI will be aligned with CPIH from 2030.

Because breakevens reflect both expectations and premia, many policy analyses use term-structure models that separate these components and publish model-based series for expected inflation alongside market breakevens.

== Liquidity and microstructure ==
Trading depth in inflation-indexed bonds is typically lower than in comparable nominal government bonds, with wider bid–ask spreads and time-varying liquidity conditions. Microstructure studies document how auction cycles, supply events and dealer balance-sheet constraints can affect prices and the transmission from index-linked markets to breakevens. Work that decomposes risk and liquidity in TIPS indicates that variation in relative liquidity can influence measured inflation compensation and expected excess returns over time.

== Applications ==
Institutional investors that face price-indexed liabilities use inflation-indexed bonds to reduce the mismatch between asset cash flows and obligations. Defined benefit pension schemes in particular combine long-dated index-linked gilts or TIPS with interest-rate and inflation swaps as part of liability-driven investment frameworks, and official guidance for trustees discusses risk controls when leverage or collateralised strategies are used. Central bank and international publications also note that the availability and maturity range of inflation-linked bonds influence how effectively pension funds and insurers can hedge long-duration indexed benefits.

Sovereign issuers include the United States and the United Kingdom among others. Typical holders are defined benefit pension schemes, insurers and long-horizon savers that seek to match indexed obligations or preserve purchasing power. Liability-driven investors often combine long-dated index-linked bonds with interest-rate and inflation swaps within governance frameworks that address leverage, collateral and liquidity management.

== Related instruments ==
Inflation risk can also be transferred using derivatives such as zero-coupon inflation swaps, year-on-year swaps, and inflation caps and floors. Academic models price TIPS and related derivatives in a unified framework that links real and nominal term structures with the dynamics of the price index. Derivatives can avoid some bond-specific features, such as accrued indexation and settlement conventions, but they introduce counterparty and collateral considerations that differ from holding a sovereign bond.

== Risks and limitations ==
Outcomes depend on the reference index, the indexation lag and the presence of a deflation floor. Basis risk can arise when a holder’s personal inflation differs from the index embedded in the bond, and liquidity premia can move market prices away from values implied by long-run expectations. In the United States, taxable investors are generally required to recognise the inflation-related increase in principal as original issue discount in the year it accrues, even if cash is not received at that time. Programme documentation from debt management offices sets out additional features, including index choice, settlement conventions and clawback or floor provisions.

== Programme status ==
Several programmes have changed status in recent years. The Government of Canada announced the cessation of Real Return Bond issuance in November 2022, citing low demand and a focus on core nominal sectors. The German Finance Agency announced that no further inflation-linked federal securities would be issued or reopened from 2024, with outstanding issues continuing to trade. Other sovereign programmes continue to issue across a range of maturities under their published frameworks.

== See also ==
- Treasury Inflation-Protected Securities
- Inflation swap
- I Bond
