= Inflation swap =

Swap that exchanges fixed inflation for realised price-index inflation

An inflation swap is an over-the-counter derivative in which one party pays a fixed inflation rate and the other pays the realised change in a price index such as CPI, RPI or HICP. Markets trade two main structures: the zero-coupon inflation swap, which settles once at maturity, and the year-on-year inflation swap, which pays periodic coupons. Users include pension funds, insurers and other investors that hedge inflation risk or take views on inflation. In major currencies, many inflation swaps are available for central clearing.

== Mechanics ==
An inflation swap exchanges two legs on a notional amount. The fixed leg pays a pre-agreed annualised rate. The floating leg pays realised inflation measured from a published price index.

For a zero-coupon inflation swap (ZCIS), the floating leg is based on an index ratio $I_T/I_0 - 1$, where $I_0$ and $I_T$ are the reference index levels at the start and end of the swap after applying market conventions. The contract settles once at maturity. For a year-on-year (YoY) inflation swap, each coupon period pays the realised 12-month inflation rate for that period.

Indexation lag reflects the delay between the observation month and publication. Markets also use interpolation to obtain daily reference levels between monthly index prints. Conventions vary by currency. For example, UK RPI swaps often use a two-month lag with no interpolation, while USD and EUR swaps often use a three-month lag with linear interpolation.

== Types and quoting conventions ==
Two common structures are traded.

- Zero-coupon inflation swap (ZCIS). A single exchange at maturity. The swap is quoted as a single par inflation rate for the full term.
- Year-on-year (YoY) inflation swap. Periodic coupons pay the realised year-over-year inflation against a fixed rate.

Common quoting conventions (illustrative)
Currency	Price index	Typical lag	Interpolation	Common tenors
EUR	HICP ex-tobacco (HICPxT)	3 months	Linear	1–50 years
GBP	RPI	2 months	None	1–50 years
USD	CPI-U NSA	3 months	Linear	1–30 years

Additional sources summarise practice across currencies and tenors.

== Valuation and pricing ==
At trade date the par swap rate sets the present value of the fixed leg equal to the present value of the inflation leg. For a zero-coupon inflation swap (ZCIS) with maturity $T$ and notional $N$ under OIS discounting:

$N\,D(0,T)\,\big((1+K)^{T}-1\big) = N\,D(0,T)\,\left(\mathbb{E}^{\mathbb{Q}}\!\left[\frac{I_{T}}{I_{0}}\right]-1\right)$

where $K$ is the par rate, $D(0,T)$ is the discount factor to time $T$, $I_{0}$ and $I_{T}$ are the reference index levels at the start and end of the contract after applying the lag and interpolation rules, and $\mathbb{E}^{\mathbb{Q}}[\cdot]$ denotes risk-neutral expectation.

Inflation swaps relate to breakeven inflation inferred from nominal and inflation-linked bonds. Differences arise from seasonality and indexation lags, from liquidity, and from risk premia. Central-bank analysis explains how these technical factors affect the information content of swap rates for inflation expectations.

== Uses ==
Pension funds and insurers hedge index-linked liabilities with inflation swaps. Infrastructure and utilities firms hedge revenues or costs that track price indices. Traders use swaps to take positions on headline inflation or on parts of the curve, for example five-year versus ten-year ZCIS.

Policy institutions track inflation swap rates as one measure of market-based inflation compensation and explain how to use these rates with other indicators.

Transaction-level evidence for the United Kingdom shows which sectors buy and sell inflation insurance over time.

== Market structure and regulation ==
Inflation swaps trade over the counter through dealers and interdealer brokers. In major currencies, many instruments are eligible for central clearing.

Standard documentation uses the ISDA interest rate derivatives definitions. The 2021 ISDA Definitions superseded the 2006 definitions for many interest rate products and set out updated terms and processes used with inflation swaps. Clearing services adopted the 2021 definitions in their rule books for eligible products.

== Risks ==
- Mismatch risk. A hedge may not perfectly match the liability index or its conventions, for example hedging CPIH liabilities with RPI swaps, or differences between swap and bond lags and seasonality.
- Index-lag and seasonal effects. Short-horizon pricing is sensitive to index lags and seasonal patterns. Market practice uses linear interpolation for daily reference levels in some currencies.
- Liquidity and technical drivers. Liquidity conditions and technical effects can move swap rates away from pure inflation expectations, especially at times of stress.
- Counterparty and collateral. Uncleared trades carry bilateral counterparty and collateral risk. Clearing reduces bilateral credit exposures subject to the clearing house's risk framework.

== History ==
Inflation swaps developed alongside inflation-linked government bond markets in the late 1990s and early 2000s. By the early 2010s, transaction data showed a growing United States market and improving transparency, with dealers quoting ZCIS and YoY structures across a range of maturities. In the euro area, inflation-linked swap rates became a standard market-based indicator for policy analysis.

== Relationship to other instruments ==
Inflation-linked bonds and inflation swaps both reference price indices but differ in cash-flow structure and conventions. Conceptually, a combination of a nominal bond and a zero-coupon inflation swap can replicate some features of an inflation-linked cash flow, subject to seasonality, lag and liquidity differences that affect measured breakeven inflation.

== Example calculations ==
Zero-coupon inflation swap. A five-year ZCIS references an index with a three-month lag. At maturity the floating payer pays $N\!\left(\frac{I_T}{I_0} - 1\right)$. The fixed payer pays $N\!\left((1+K)^5 - 1\right)$. The par rate $K$ at trade date equates the present values.

Year-on-year inflation swap. Each coupon period pays the realised 12-month inflation against a fixed rate, using the index levels defined by the contract lag and interpolation rules.

== Documentation and standards ==
Inflation swaps are documented under the ISDA interest rate derivatives definitions. The 2021 ISDA Interest Rate Derivatives Definitions replaced the 2006 definitions for many products and are widely used in new trades. Clearing services adopted the 2021 definitions in their rule books for eligible products.

== See also ==
- Inflation-linked bond
- Break-even inflation
- Liability-driven investment strategy
- Interest rate swap
- Consumer price index
