= Thomas Bassett Macaulay =

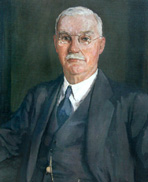
T. B. Macaulay

Thomas Bassett Macaulay, also known as T. B. Macaulay, (6 June 1860 – 3 April 1942) is a noted actuary of his era, a philanthropist; and was the founder of the Macaulay Institute, in 1930. It has been estimated that most of the world's Holstein cattle descend from Macaulay's herd.

== Background ==
Thomas Bassett Macaulay was born in Hamilton, Ontario, the son of Barbara Marie Reid and the Scottish-born Robertson Macaulay (1833–1915), who emigrated to Canada in 1854. The family were descendants of the Macaulay family of Lewis, and were patrilineal descendants of the 17th century Uig folk-hero Donald Cam Macaulay. Robertson Macaulay married Barbara Marie Reid, and moved his family to Montreal, Quebec, Canada, when he was offered a position there with Sun Life Assurance Company. He joined as a secretary in 1874; by 1889, he had worked his way up to president.

== Life ==
Thomas Bassett Macaulay graduated high school and joined Sun Life at the age of 17. For the next 40 years he worked for the company as actuary (aged 20), secretary, managing director (46), president (55). He served as president for 20 years, before his retirement as chairman.

Macaulay was a Fellow of the Institute of Actuaries of Great Britain. He was one of four Canadian charter members of the Actuarial Society of America. In 1899, he became the first Canadian to be president of the society; as well as its youngest president, at age 39. When he died in 1942, Macaulay was also the longest surviving charter member. Macaulay represented the actuaries of both Canada and the United States at the International Congresses, held in Paris and Berlin, in the years 1900 and 1906. He was also a fellow of the Royal Statistical Society, president of the Canadian Life Assurance Officers' Association, and president of the Canadian West Indian League and became an honorary president of the Navy League of Canada. In 1915 he became president of Sun Life Assurance Company of Canada.

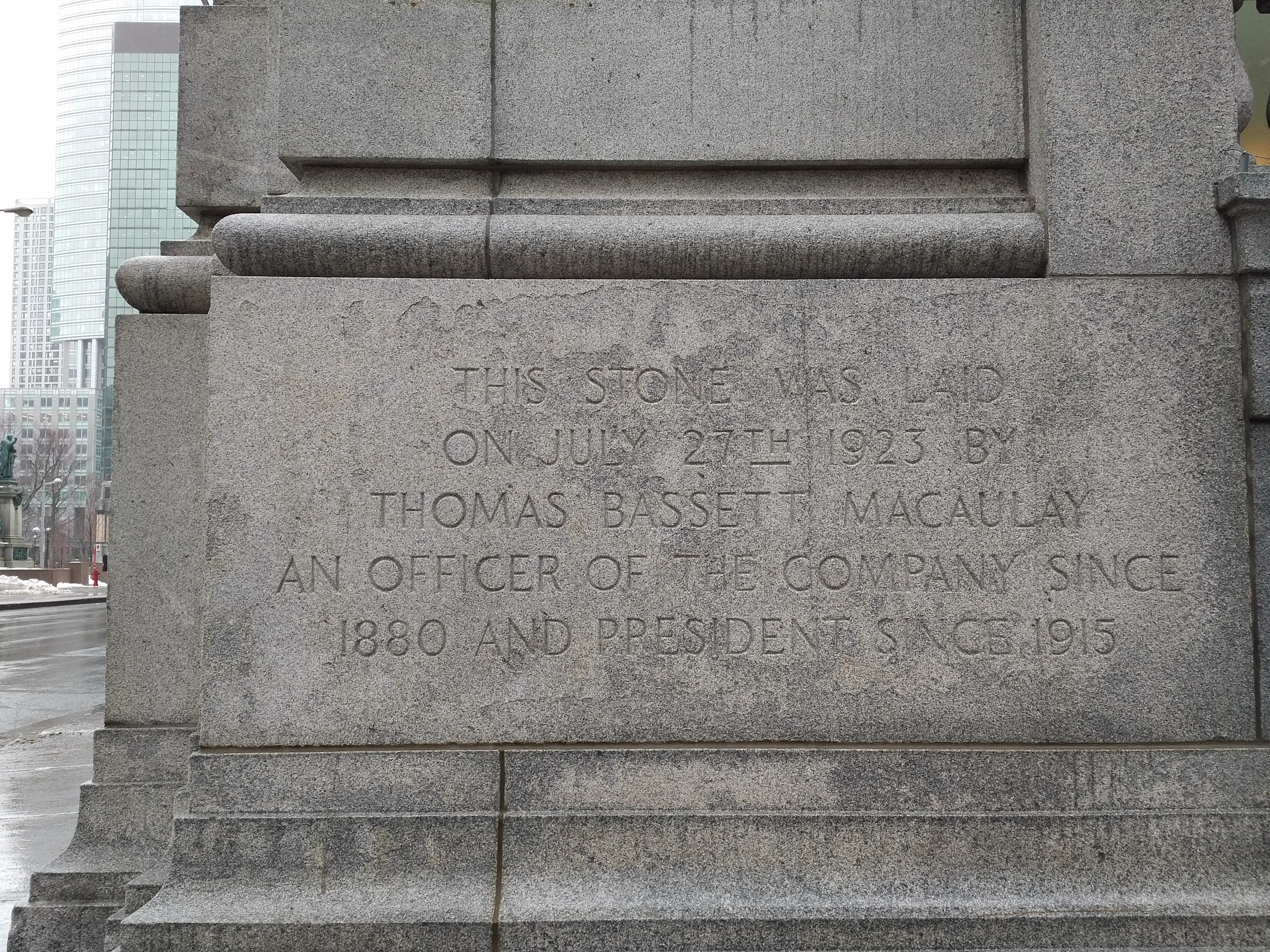
Commemorative corner stone of the Sun Life building.

In 1914 he became one of the inaugural fellows of the American Statistical Association. In 1917, he was the chairman of the National Committee on Food Resources, he also was the governor of the Montreal General Hospital, as well as the Fraser-Hickson Institute public library in Montreal.

Macaulay created a fund of £10,000 to assist the seafaring people of his father's hometown, Fraserburgh, Scotland. He also gave £10,000 to research into animal breeding at the University of Edinburgh. He gave money to the public library on the Isle of Lewis, erected a wing in the Island's hospital and established the Macaulay Experimental Farm. In 1930, he funded the purchase of 50 acres (200,000 m^{2}), to establish the Macaulay Institute for Soil Research. Macaulay received an honorary degree from the University of Aberdeen, and McGill University, and the town of Stornoway made him the first freeman of the burgh in 300 years.

== Holstein herd ==
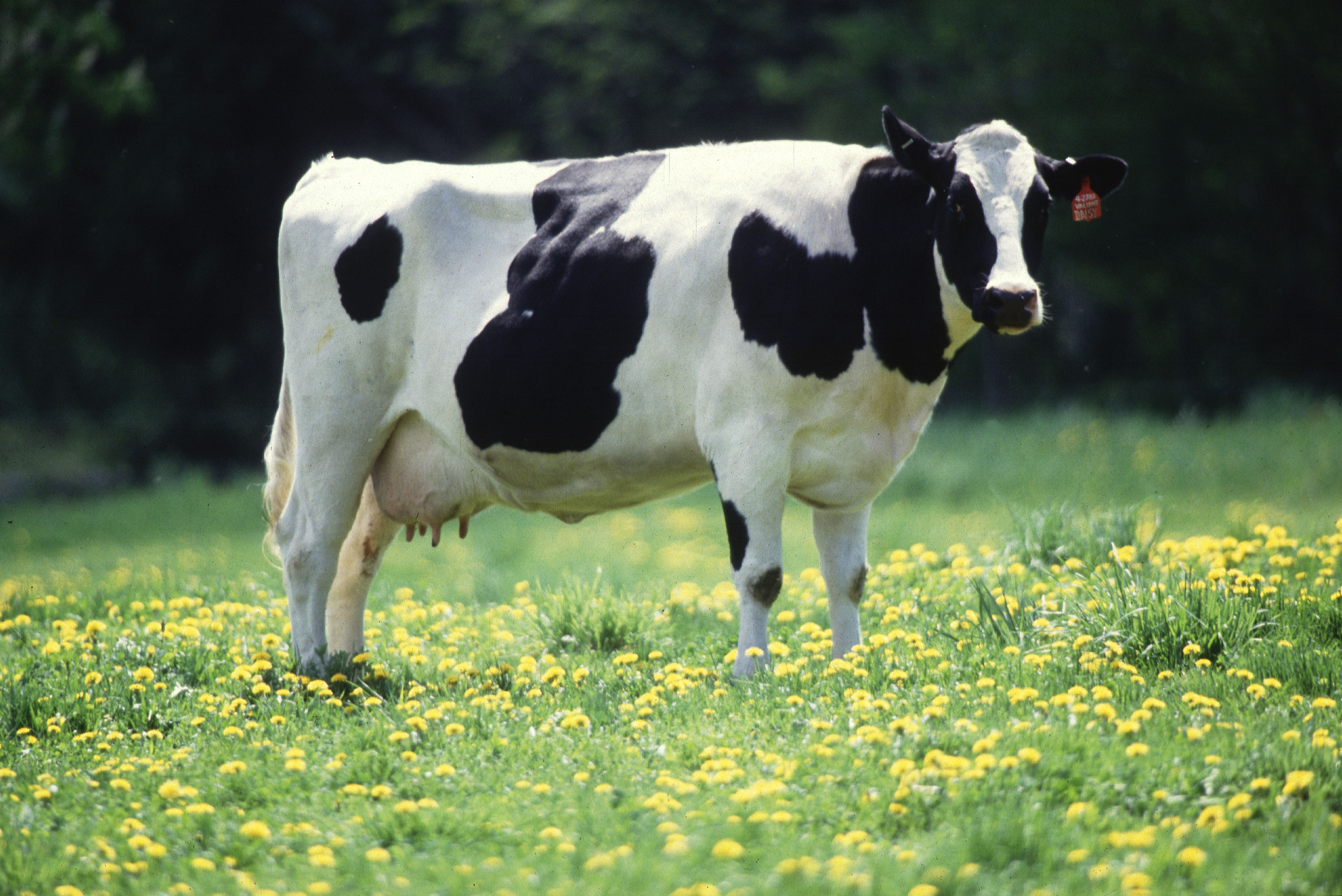
Many of the world's Holstein cattle descend from Macaulay's herd.

It has been stated that most of the world's pure-bred Holstein cattle descend from Macaulays herd, raised on his farm in Quebec. Macaulay and farm manager, Joe Chandler, bought a bull named "Johanna Rag Apple Pabst" (also known as "Old Joe"), for $15,000. The bull sired 51 bulls and 44 cows; after Macaulay's death in 1942, the herd was dispersed and went on to produce most of the pure-breds in the world. For his work as a breeder and farmer and his devotion to the advancement of agriculture in the province of Quebec, Thomas Bassett Macaulay was posthumously inducted to the Agricultural Hall of Fame of Quebec in 1992

== Family ==
In 1881, Macaulay married Henrietta M. L. Bragg, from New Orleans, Louisiana, United States. Bragg was the niece of US Confederate Army general Braxton Bragg. The couple had one son, followed by three daughters, and finally another son. One of their children was Frederick Macaulay, best known for his work on bond durations. Macaulay had two later marriages. In 1912, he married Margaret Allan of London, England; in 1920, he married Margaret Palin of Gloucester, England. He did not have any children in his later two marriages.
