= Harm Osmers =

German football referee (born 1985)

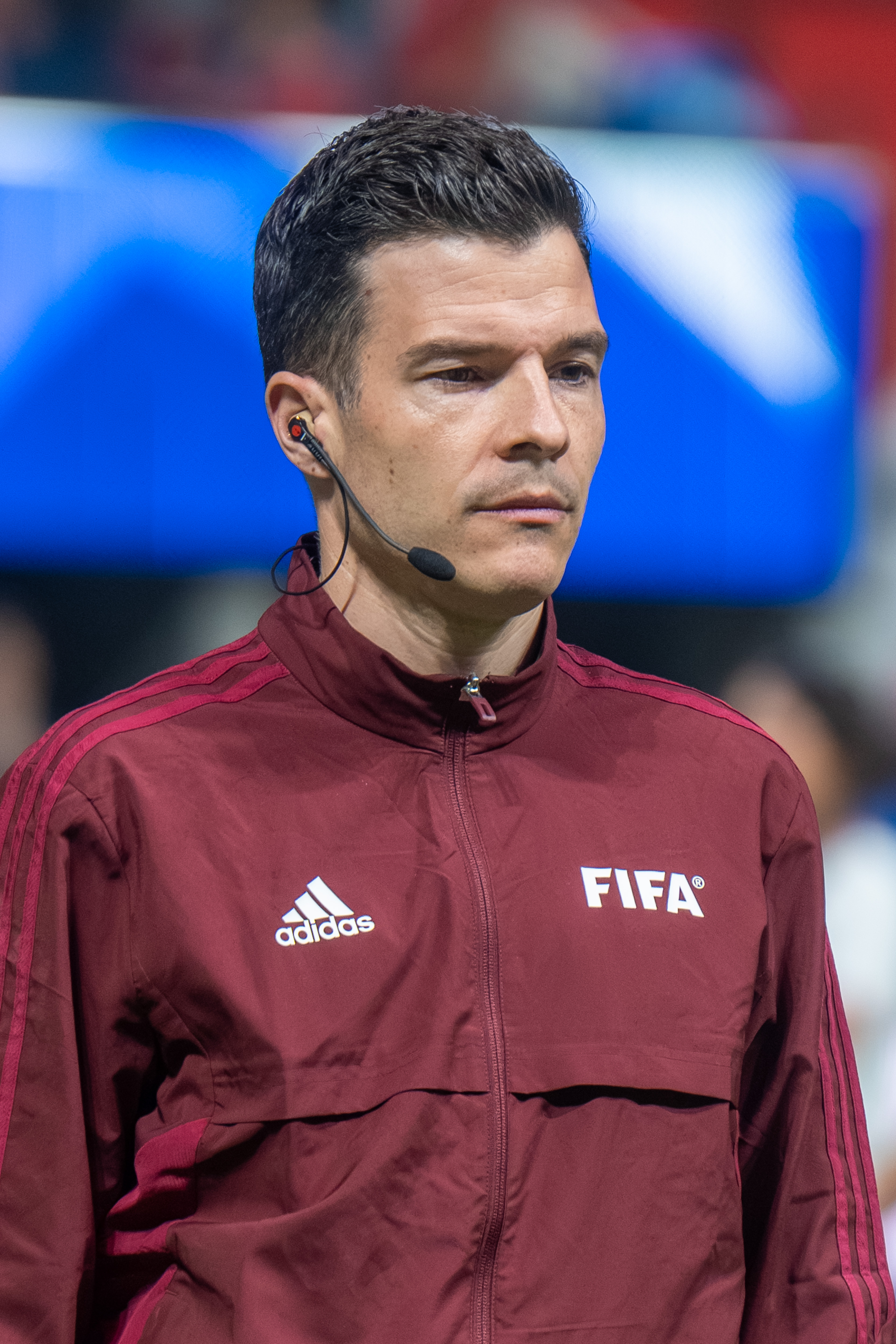
- Harm Osmers in 2026
- Born: 28 January 1985 (age 41); Bremen, West Germany
- Other occupation: Investment controller

Domestic
Years	League	Role
2009–	DFB	Referee
2011–	2. Bundesliga	Referee
2016–	Bundesliga	Referee

International
Years	League	Role
2020–	FIFA listed	Referee

Harm Osmers (born 28 January 1985) is a German football referee who is based in Hanover. He referees for SV Baden of the Lower Saxony Football Association. He is a FIFA referee, and is ranked as a UEFA first category referee.

== Refereeing career ==
Osmers began as a referee at his hometown club SV Baden and in 2001 became a B-youth referee. In 2009, he became a DFB referee, and was appointed as a 2. Bundesliga referee in 2011. Since 2011, he also serves as an assistant referee and fourth official in the Bundesliga. On 15 July 2015, he made an international debut as an assistant for Daniel Siebert for the UEFA Champions League qualifier between Celtic and Stjarnan. In the summer of 2016, Osmers was one of four referees promoted to officiate in the Bundesliga.

== Personal life ==
Osmers has a diploma in business administration and works as an investment controller in Hanover.
