= Robertson Macaulay =

Canadian businessman (1833–1915)

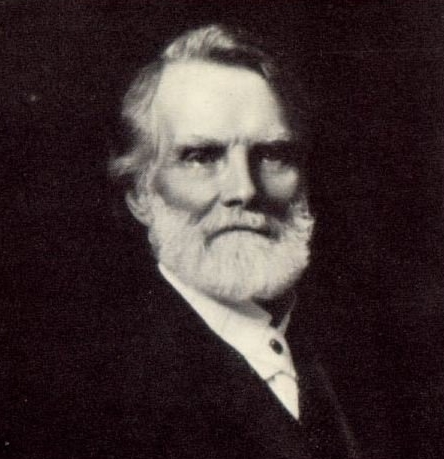
- Born: January 20, 1833; Fraserburgh, Scotland
- Died: September 27, 1915 (aged 82); Montreal, Quebec, Canada
- Known for: President of Sun Life Assurance Company of Canada

Robertson Macaulay (January 20, 1833 – September 27, 1915) was a Canadian insurance company executive.

Born in Fraserburgh, Scotland, the son of Kenneth Macaulay and Margaret Noble, Macaulay emigrated to Canada in 1854 settling in Quebec. In 1856, he started working at the Canada Life Assurance Company as an accountant where he would remain until 1872 rising to become chief accountant. He worked for the Mutual Life Association of Canada until becoming secretary of the Sun Mutual Life Insurance Company of Montreal (later the Sun Life Assurance Company of Canada). In 1884, he was appointed managing director and was named president in 1889 succeeding the first president, Thomas Workman. He retired as managing director in 1908 and was succeeded by his son, Thomas Bassett Macaulay (a.k.a. "T. B. Macaulay").

He was a member of the Congregational Church. He died in 1915 in Montreal.
