= Investment control =

Monitoring function within asset or portfolio management

Investment control or investment controlling is a monitoring function within asset management, portfolio management or investment management. It is concerned with independently supervising and monitoring the quality of asset management accounts with the aim of ensuring performance and quality in order to provide the required benefit for the asset management client. Dependent on setup, investment controlling not only encompasses controlling activities but also can include areas from compliance to performance review. Investment controlling aspects can also be taken into consideration by asset management clients or investment advisers/consultants and consequently it is likely that these stakeholders also run certain investment controlling activities.

== See also ==
- Fixed-income attribution
- Investment management
- Performance attribution
- Portfolio (finance)
