= Frederick Macaulay =

American economist

Frederick Robertson Macaulay (August 12, 1882 – March 1970) was a Canadian economist of the Institutionalist School. He is known for introducing the concept of bond duration. Macaulay's contributions also include a mammoth empirical study of the time series behavior of interest rates published in 1938 and a study of short selling on the New York Stock Exchange (Macaulay and Durand, 1951). The term "Macaulay duration" is named after him.

Macaulay was born in Montreal to a family influential in Montreal business; his father, Thomas Bassett Macaulay, was a well-known actuary. He obtained his bachelor's and master's degrees from the University of Colorado in 1909 and 1920, respectively. He also obtained a law degree in 1911. In 1924, he obtained a PhD from Columbia University.

Macaulay worked at the National Bureau of Economic Research from 1921 until 1938. He also taught at the New School of Social Research. In 1923 he was elected as a Fellow of the American Statistical Association. In 1938, Macaulay became research director of the Twentieth Century Fund.

== Selected writings ==
- Macaulay, F. (1910). Money, credit and the price of securities, University of Colorado.
- Frederick Robertson Macaulay (1922). The Personal Distribution of Income in the United States. Harcourt, Brace.
- Frederick Robertson Macaulay (1938). The Social Sciences and the Unknown Future. National Bureau of Economic Research.
- Macaulay, F. (1938). The Movements of Interest Rates. Bond Yields and Stock Prices in the United States since 1856, New York: National Bureau of Economic Research.
- Macaulay, F. and Durand D. (1951). Short selling on the New York Stock Exchange, New York: Twentieth Century Fund.
- Frederick Robertson Macaulay (1999). Some Theoretical Problems Suggested by the Movements of Interest Rates, Bond Yields and Stock Prices in the United States Since 1856. Risk Books. ISBN 978-1-899332-72-4.
