= Stac Dhòmhnaill Chaim =

Coordinates: 58°10′14.85″N 7°5′57.54″W

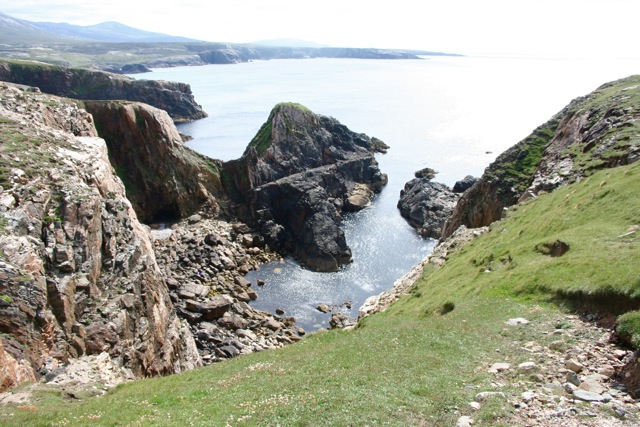
Stac Dhomnuill Chaim, near Mangursta (or Mangersta), Lewis, in 2008.

Stac Dhòmnuill Chaim, or Stac Dhòmhnaill Chaim, or Stac Domhnuill Chaim, is a fortified promontory located near Mangursta (or Mangersta, Scottish Gaelic: Mangarstadh) on the Isle of Lewis in the Outer Hebrides of Scotland. The stack and its surrounding site is listed and protected as a scheduled monument. The site of the stack is located at grid reference NB00223152. The site is named after Donald Cam Macaulay, the early 17th century hero of the Macaulays of Uig. The site was documented in the late 19th century, but today it is considered inaccessible. In 2003 and 2006, an archaeological team of rock climbers scaled the promontory and documented the site; finding in 2006 a piece of possibly Neolithic pottery.

== Overview ==
Stac Dhomnuill Chaim when translated from Scottish Gaelic means "One-eyed Donald's stack". It is a promontory fort located near Mangursta on the west coast of the Isle of Lewis in the Outer Hebrides (grid reference NB00223152). It is said to be the traditional refuge of the early 17th century Uig hero Donald Cam Macaulay, who was a chieftain of the Macaulays of Lewis. The 19th-century historian F W L Thomas stated that there were stories in Uig that recounted how Donald Cam's daughter, Anna Mhòr ("big Anne"), would carry water to her father upon her head because her hands were required to climb the treacherous path to the top.

== Description of the site ==
Stac Dhomnuill Chaim was documented in the late 19th century by the historian F W L Thomas who stated it was 100 feet (30 m) high and no more than 20 feet (6.1 m) long at the top. He described the promontory as almost cut off from the nearby shore by a very deep ravine, though it remained connected to the mainland by a rocky isthmus. The stack which is surrounded by the sea, was completely inaccessible except from the land side by a narrow path. According to Thomas this was guarded by 4 feet (1.2 m) to 5 feet (1.5 m) thick wall on the land side, in which there was a 2 feet (0.61 m) gap or gateway on the southern side. Upon the stack, Thomas described the remains of a cottage measuring 18.5 feet (5.6 m) long and 10 feet (3.0 m) wide, with walls that are 4.5 feet (1.4 m) thick. Connected to the cottage were the remains of a sheep pen.

== Scheduling ==
In 1992, Stac Dhomnuill Chaim was added to the list of scheduled monuments and in consequence was given legal protection under the Ancient Monuments and Archaeological Areas Act 1979. It was scheduled because,

"The monument is of national importance because it is a significant field monument and a site that is of considerable interest to scholars of local tradition and late Scottish Medieval history. The area may also contain evidence of earlier prehistoric occupation."

The area protected is irregular shaped, measuring a maximum of 200 metres (660 ft) northeast-southwest by 100 metres (330 ft) northwest-southeast.

Captain F W L Thomas's plan of the site, published posthumously in 1890.

== Archaeological investigations ==
In July 1969, the site was visited by a Field Investigator of the Ordnance Survey's Archaeology Division. By then the narrow path across the isthmus had deteriorated because of cliff falls and the site was considered to be inaccessible. The Investigator's observations from the opposite cliff concluded that the site seemed to appear as Thomas's plans had shown it in the late 19th century.

In 2003, the site was visited by members of the Severe Terrain Archaeological Campaign (STAC). At the time it was clear to the team that the coast was rapidly eroding the site. The building upon the site were also documented. The remains of structure A are of a circular, turf and stone building measuring to about 2 metres (6.6 ft) in diameter. The structure adjoins the perimeter wall (structure C) on the north-east edge of the stack. The structure has no apparent entrance. Structure B is the remains of a sub-rectangular turf and stone building, measuring 5 metres (16 ft) by 10 metres (33 ft) externally and 2 metres (6.6 ft) by 6 metres (20 ft) internally. The building occupies the centre of the stack and is separated from structure A by a narrow gap, which would likely have been wider before the deterioration of the structures. Structure B also has no apparent entrance. Structure C is the perimeter wall which is constructed of turf and stone. It extends from the northern end of the stack, down to the eastern side, to its southern end. The wall is hard to define at the southern end, though it is possible that it encloses two terraces on the south end of the stack. At the southern end of the second terrace there are the faint remains of a possibly earlier wall. It is possible this wall could represent an earlier and longer phase of the perimeter wall.

Later in 2006, the site was visited by a local descendant of Dhomhnuill Chaim in conjunction with the STAC. During this visit a large piece of pottery was discovered which has since been identified as early prehistoric and possibly Neolithic.

These investigations led the archaeologists to conclude that, depending on winter storm conditions, it is possible that in the next two decades the site might be totally destroyed by erosion and collapse of the stack. Some time before that it will become inaccessible and thus excavations should be undertaken were soon. Though no further work has been recorded in Canmore as of 2021.

== See also ==
- History of the Western Isles
- Isle of Lewis
- Clan Macaulay of Lewis. the family and descendants of Donald Cam
