= Credit spread =

Credit spread may refer to:

- Credit spread (option)
- Credit spread (bond)
