= Hillock (surname) =

Hillock and Hillocks are surnames. Notable people with these surname include:

== Hillock ==
- Jay Hillock (born c. 1949), American basketball coach
- Poh Wah Hillock, Singaporean and Australian mathematician

== Hillocks ==
- George Hillocks Jr. (1934–2014), American professor of English
- James Hillocks (born 1915), Scottish painter
- Samuel Bacon Hillocks (1869–1937), Canadian politician
