= Vincent Arcilesi =

American landscape artist (1932–2022)

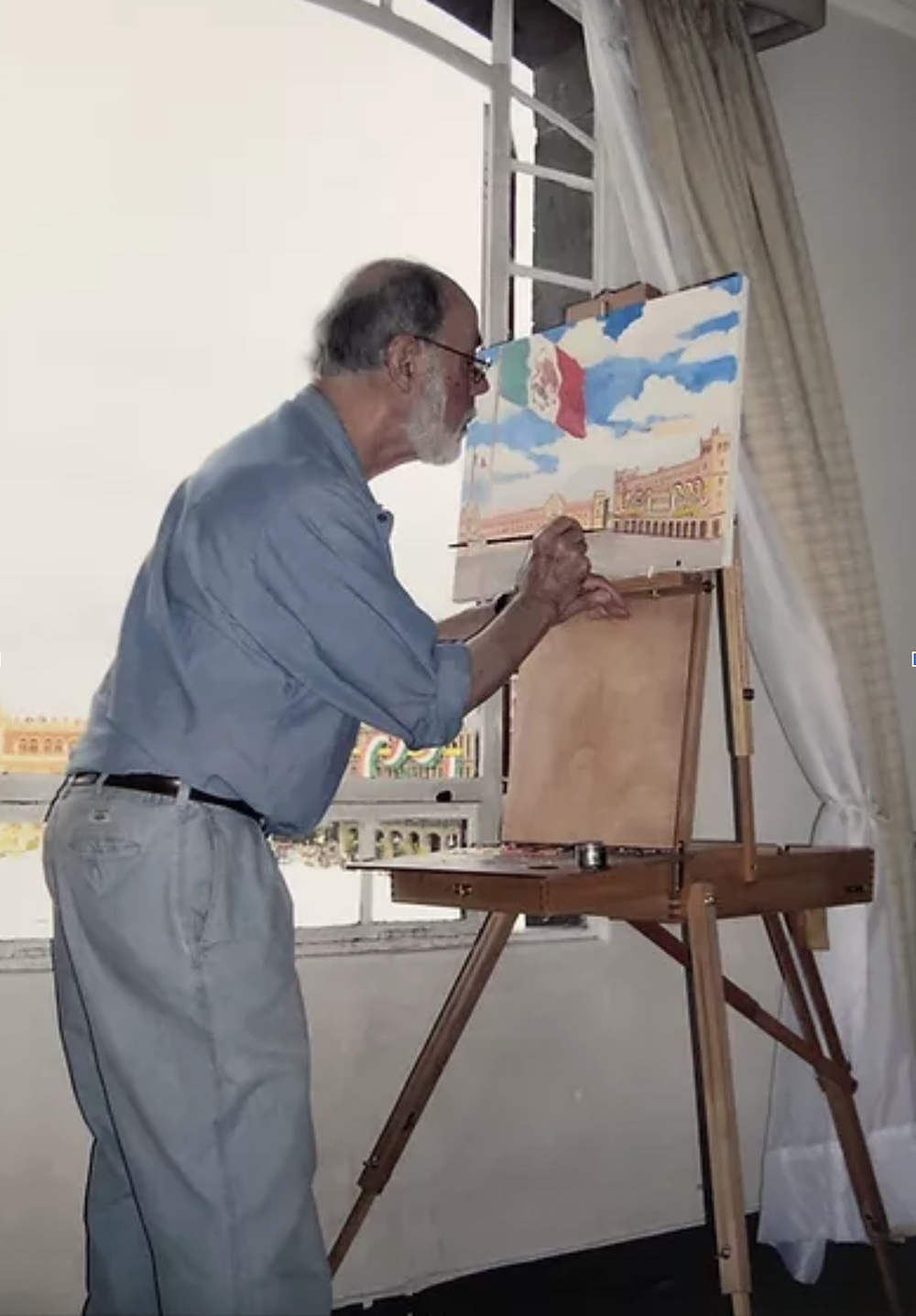
- Vincent Arcilesi in Mexico City creating his painting Palacio Nacional, a 16 x 20" oil on canvas piece
- Born: Vincent J. Arcilesi; 1932
- Died: 2022 (aged 89–90)
- Education: Art Institute of Chicago University of Oklahoma
- Occupations: Artist and Professor
- Style: American Realism, European Classicism, Abstract Expressionism, Avant-Garde, Impressionism, Post-Impressionism, Italian Renaissance
- Spouse: Nan Chapin Arcilesi
- Children: Francesca Arcilesi, Piero Arcilesi

Vincent J. Arcilesi (1932–2022) was a New York-based Contemporary figurative and landscape artist. His work has been shown internationally at prominent museums and galleries throughout the mid-20th and early 21st centuries.

He has also been featured in various notable publications such as Art in America, The New York Times, Huffington Post, Gallery & Studio Magazine, and American Artist. His work resides in museum collections, including The Hirshorn Museum, The Art Institute of Chicago, The Chicago Museum of Contemporary Art, Krannert Art Museum, and the Illinois State Museum. Arcilesi created large-scale murals, small oil paintings, drawings and lithographs, Arcilesi's style shifted cyclically throughout his life from European Classicism, Abstract Expressionism, Avant-Garde, Impressionism, Post-Impressionism, and Italian Renaissance.

== Education and life ==
Arcilesi attended Furman University in Greenville, SC. After receiving a BFA in Design at the University of Oklahoma, he eventually moved to Chicago to achieve a BFA and MFA in drawing and painting at the School of the Art Institute of Chicago, where he was trained as an abstract painter, and where he also met his wife, Nan Chapin Arcilesi.

Since his school days at the Art Institute of Chicago, Arcilesi immersed himself in the school's collection of Impressionist and Post-Impressionist pieces. Arcilesi exhibited alongside other students in the school's Junior Museum throughout his matriculation as well as his participation in the school's Gallery Talks, Slide Lecture and Film sessions.

Later in his career, Arcilesi began directing much of his energy toward painting representational landscapes seen in his travels abroad. As a result, Arcilesi held many exhibitions showing this work at The Broome Street Gallery through the late 90s and early 2000s. These exhibitions consisted of his works created in a particular place in the world, always entitled "Arcilesi in" with their respective country, which included Morocco, Rome, Russia, and Mexico.

Arcilesi was heavily involved with the New York Artists Equity Association (NYAEA) from the 90s throughout the rest of his life, as well as a recurring featured artist at galleries such as the Blue Mountain Gallery, 2/20 Gallery (now closed), and The Broome Street Gallery (now closed). He participated in many artist-run exhibitions such as those held by the Artist's Choice Museum. Arcilesi was a full professor at the Fashion Institute of Technology (FIT) from the 90s to his retirement in 2015 where he taught life drawing and painting and participated in several faculty exhibitions and art shows held at FIT. During his time at FIT, Arcilesi participated in notable panels and speaker sessions where he discussed his artwork in line with the subject at hand. One example of this is his session, “Sex and the City: Lovers in Rome, New York, and Paris,” at the 1999 FIT Seminar “Healthy Sexuality in the 21st Century.”

Arcilesi was awarded Sabbatical Leave in 2002 to study painting in Morocco and in 2009 to study painting in Rome. He was also granted Leave in 1994 to “create 4 large paintings dealing with mythology in the Italian landscape.

== Selected drawings and paintings ==
A selection of Arcilesi's drawings & paintings can be found on Issuu.

== Notable exhibitions ==
- America 1976 BiCentennial Sponsored by United States Department of the Interior
  - Dates: March 11, 1978 through May 21, 1978
  - Included Arcilesi works:
    - Grand Canyon, oil on canvas, 48 x 60"
    - View from Point Imperial, oil on canvas, 48 x 60"
    - Angels Landing, oil on canvas, 36 x 40"
  - Shown at:
    - The Corcoran Gallery of Art
    - The Wadsworth Atheneum
    - The Fogg Art Museum
    - Institute of Contemporary Art
    - The Minneapolis Institute of Arts
    - The Milwaukee Art Center
    - The Fort Worth Art Museum
    - The San Francisco Museum of Modern Art
    - The High Museum of Art
    - The Brooklyn Museum

== Publications and reviews ==
- Huff Post, October 2017: Vincent Arcilesi Retrospective Profiles a Stylistic Virtuoso
- Gallery & Studio Magazine, September / October 2010 Edition: Arcilesi's New Roman Idyll by Ed McCormack
- Gallery & Studio Magazine, April / May 2013 Edition
- The Villager, March 1995: Cand Greek Mythology, Celia Bergoffen,
- Arcilesi and the Immediacy of Myth, 1991 by Ed McCormack
- Artists of the Ideal by Edward Lucie-Smith
- Arts Magazine, May 1977, Vol. 51, No. 9: Hedy O'Beil review on Arcilesi's oil painting
- ArtSpeak, February 1985, Vol. 4, No. 2: Palmer Poroner reviews Arcilesi's work through a romanticist lens

== Awards and sabbaticals ==
- 1982 Arts Visual Artists Fellowship Grant
- 2009 Sabbatical, FIT, NYC, Travel, Study painting in Rome
- 2002 Sabbatical Grant, FIT NYC, Travel, Study painting in Morocco

== Works held in permanent collections ==
- The Hirshhorn
- The Art Institute of Chicago
- Chicago Museum of Contemporary Art
- Krannert Art Museum
- Pratt Institute Libraries Teaching Collection
- Solomon R. Guggenheim Museum Archives
- Smithsonian Institution Online Archives
