= United States Congress Bicentennial commemorative coins =

1989 series of commemorative coins

The United States Congress Bicentennial commemorative coins are a series of commemorative coins which were issued by the United States Mint in 1989.

== Legislation ==
The Bicentennial of the United States Congress Commemorative Coin Act (Pub. L. 100–673) authorized the production of three coins, a clad half dollar, a silver dollar, and a gold half eagle. Congress authorized the coins to commemorate the bicentennial of the United States Congress. The act allowed the coins to be struck in both proof and uncirculated finishes.

== Designs ==
=== Half Dollar ===
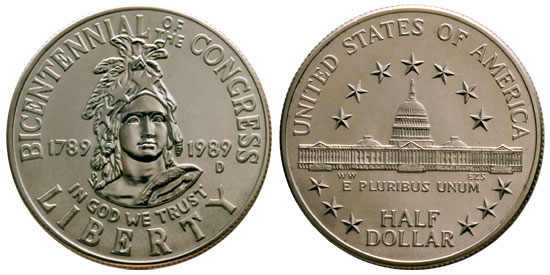
U.S. Congress Bicentennial half dollar obverse (left) and reverse (right)

The obverse of the U.S. Congress Bicentennial commemorative half dollar, designed by Patricia Lewis Verani, features a bust of the Statue of Freedom. The reverse of the coin, designed by William Woodward, features a full view of the Capitol Building surrounded by a wreath.

=== Dollar ===
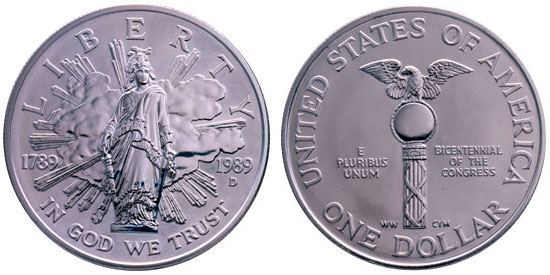
U.S. Congress Bicentennial silver dollar obverse (left) and reverse (right)

The obverse of the U.S. Congress Bicentennial commemorative dollar, designed by William Woodward, features the Statue of Freedom which towers at the peak of the Capitol Dome. The reverse of the coin, also designed by Woodward, features the Mace of the House of Representatives, which resides in the House Chamber whenever the House is in session along with an eagle astride a world globe.

=== Half eagle ===
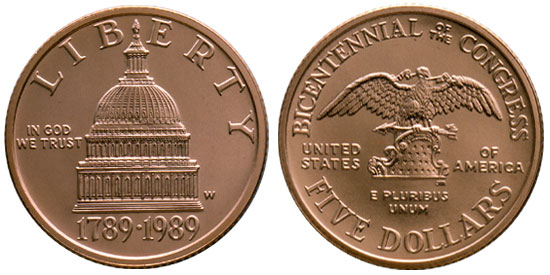
U.S. Congress Bicentennial gold half eagle obverse (left) and reverse (right)

The obverse of the U.S. Congress Bicentennial half eagle, designed by John Mercanti, features a rendition of the U.S. Capitol dome. The reverse of the coin, also designed by Mercanti, features a portrait of the majestic eagle overlooking the canopy of the Old Senate Chamber.

== Specifications ==
Half Dollar

- Display Box Color: Gray
- Edge: Reeded
- Weight: 11.340 grams
- Diameter: 30.61 millimeters; 1.205 inches
- Composition: 92% copper; 8% nickel (Cupronickel)

Dollar

- Display Box Color: Gray
- Edge: Reeded
- Weight: 26.730 grams; 0.8594 troy ounce
- Diameter: 38.10 millimeters; 1.50 inches
- Composition: 90% Silver, 10% Copper

Half Eagle

- Display Box Color: Gray
- Edge: Reeded
- Weight: 8.359 grams; 0.2687 troy ounce
- Diameter: 21.59 millimeters; 0.850 inch
- Composition: 90% Gold, 3.6% Silver, 6.4% Copper

== See also ==
- List of United States commemorative coins and medals (1980s)
- United States commemorative coins
- US Capitol Bicentennial silver dollar
