= Larry Johannessen =

American academic (1947–2009)

Larry R. Johannessen
- Born: 1947; Denver, Colorado, United States
- Died: April 21, 2009 (aged 61–62); Chicago, Illinois, United States
- Education: California State University, Hayward; The University of Chicago
- Occupation: Educator
- Employer: Northern Illinois University
- Military service
- Allegiance: United States
- Branch: U.S. Marine Corps
- Service years: 1964–1968
- Rank: Sergeant
- Units: Bravo Company, 1st Reconnaissance Battalion, 1st Marine Division
- Conflict: Vietnam War
- Awards: Presidential Unit Citation; National Defense Service Medal; Vietnam Campaign Medal; Vietnam Service Medal (3); Good Conduct Medal; Rifle Marksman Badge

Larry R. Johannessen (1947–2009) was an American educator, academic, and author. He was a professor of English at Northern Illinois University.

== Early life and military service ==
Larry R. Johannessen was born in Denver, Colorado. After his high school counselor enrolled him in vocational curriculum based on his address in a working-class area, he elected to leave before graduating and enlisted in the U.S. Marines Corps. Johannessen served two tours of duty in Vietnam. He left the Marines with an honorable discharge in 1968 at the rank of Sergeant.

== Education ==
Upon leaving the Marines, Johannessen earned his G.E.D. and earned an A.A. with honors from Ohlone College in 1973. He transferred to California State University, Hayward, and graduated magna cum laude with a B.A. in 1975. Johannessen earned his M.A.T. in 1976 in English Education from the University of Chicago, the program run by George Hillocks Jr. At the University of Chicago, he met Elizabeth (Betsy) Kahn, whom he married. They had been married for 27 years at the time of Johannessen's death. Johannessen began working on his doctoral studies in 1983 at the University of Chicago, again under the mentorship of Hillocks, graduating in 1997.

== Career ==
Johannessen taught high school English at Lyons Township High School in La Grange, Illinois, from 1976 to 1989. While a doctoral student he began teaching at universities, including Saint Xavier University in Chicago, Benedictine University in Lisle, IL, and Barat College in Lake Forest, IL. In 2001, he became an assistant professor of English at Northern Illinois University. He served as director of undergraduate studies of the English department at NIU and was promoted to full professor in 2007. Johannessen's work focused on the literature of the Vietnam War and the teaching of English, particularly on designing instruction and the experiences of beginning English teachers.

Johannessen died on April 21, 2009, at Rush University Medical Center in Chicago, of complications related to myelodysplastic syndrome.

== Awards ==
Johannessen's academic career produced a number of awards. From NCTE he won the 2006 Richard A. Meade award and the Edwin M. Hopkins Award. He was the recipient of the 2003 Illinois Association for Supervision and Curriculum Development Winn Research Award. Northern Illinois University named him the 2007 NIU Ally Award, presented to individuals who have done something positive for Lesbian, Gay, Bisexual, Transgender Community at NIU, and presented him with the College of Liberal Arts and Sciences 2005–06 Long-Term Merit/Critical Retention Award. In 1973 he was named the Outstanding Ohlone College English Student Award, and in 1990 was honored with an Ohlone College Outstanding Alumnus award. The Illinois Institute of Technology honored him with a Distinguished High School Teachers of the Chicago Area Award in 1981.

== Selected works ==
Johannessen was a prolific author and presenter. His writing was published in English Journal, The Clearing House, Research in the Teaching of English, The Social Studies, and other journals. He was the author, co-author, or co-editor of nine books, plus two textbooks on vocabulary study. Many of these publications were coauthored with his wife, Elizabeth Kahn, and his close friend Tom McCann.

- Johanessen, Larry R.; Kahn, Elizabeth; Walter, Carolyn Calhoun (1982). Designing and Sequencing Prewriting Activities. Urbana, Ill: National Council of Teachers of English.
- Kahn, Elizabeth A.; Walter, Carolyn Calhoun; Johannessen, Larry R. (1984). Writing about Literature. National Council of Teachers of English. ISBN 0-8141-5877-3.
- Scruggs, J. Atwell; Johannessen, Larry R. (1986). Steps to a Better Vocabulary: Developmental Levels I, II, III. Kendall/Hunt Publishing Company. ISBN 978-0-8403-3921-8.
- Scruggs, J. Atwell; Johannessen, Larry R. (1991-12-28). Steps to a Better Vocabulary: Advanced Levels IV and V (3rd ed.). Kendall Hunt Publishing Company. ISBN 978-0840339225.
- Johannessen, Larry R. (1992). Illumination Rounds: Teaching the Literature of the Vietnam War. Theory & research into practice. Urbana, Ill: National Council of Teachers of English. ISBN 978-0-8141-2272-3.
- Johannessen, Larry R.; McCann, Thomas M. (2002). In Case You Teach English: An Interactive Casebook for Prospective and Practicing Teachers 1st Edition. Upper Saddle River, N.J: Merrill Prentice Hall. ISBN 978-0-13-062310-2.
- McCann, Thomas M., ed. (2005). Reflective Teaching, Reflective Learning: How to Develop Critically Engaged Readers, Writers, and Speakers. Portsmouth, NH: Heinemann. ISBN 978-0-325-00852-3.
- McCann, Thomas M.; Johannessen, Larry R.; Ricca, Bernard P. (2005). Supporting Beginning English Teachers: Research and Implications for Teacher Induction. Urbana, Ill: National Council of Teachers of English. ISBN 978-0-8141-0269-5.
- McCann, Thomas M.; Kahn, Elizabeth A.; Johannessen, Larry R.; Flanagan, Joseph M. (2006). Talking in Class: Using Discussion to Enhance Teaching and Learning. Urbana, Ill: National Council of Teachers of English. ISBN 978-0-8141-5001-6.
- Johannessen, Larry R.; Kahn, Elizabeth A.; Walter, Carolyn Calhoun (2009). Writing about literature. Theory and research into practice (TRIP) series (2nd ed., rev. and updated ed.). Urban, Ill: NCTE. ISBN 978-0-8141-3211-1.
- Smagorinsky, Peter; Johannessen, Larry R.; Kahn, Elizabeth A.; McCann, Thomas M. (2010). The Dynamics of Writing Instruction: A Structured Process Approach for the Composition Teacher in the Middle and High School. Portsmouth, NH: Heinemann. ISBN 978-0-325-01193-6.
