= Kenney Mencher =

American painter (born 1965)

Kenney Mencher in Los Angeles

Kenney Mencher (born 1965), is an American painter. He was an Associate Professor of Art and Art History as well as the director and curator of the Louie-Meager Art Gallery at Ohlone College in Fremont, California until 2016. After 2016 Mencher became a full time artist but occasionally taught at community colleges in the Bay Area and Illinois.

Previously Mencher taught at institutions including the University of Chicago, University High School in San Francisco and Texas A&M International University.

He is the author of Liaisons: Readings in Art, Literature and Philosophy, a thematically-framed textbook about how the study of culture relates to students' other classes and to life in general.

== Early life and education ==
Mencher was born in New York City in 1965. He graduated from Lehman College of the City University of New York in 1991 with a bachelor's degree in art history. Subsequently, he earned a master's degree in art history from the University of California, Davis in 1994 and then a master of fine arts degree from the University of Cincinnati in 1995.

== Exhibitions ==
Mencher's work has appeared in a number of solo and two-person shows at galleries throughout the United States. He is represented by Elliott Fouts Gallery in Sacramento and Klaudia Marr Gallery in Santa Fe. He was profiled in the June 2007 issue of The Artist's Magazine, and has been a contributing author to that publication as well.

Some of his prior installations include shows at Octavia's Haze Gallery and at Varnish Fine Art in San Francisco, at the Los Gatos Art Museum, at the Triton Museum of Art in Santa Clara, California, in the "Lucky Seven" group show at the Dahlia Woods Gallery in Dallas, and at Amrithika Gallery in Palo Alto. He has also done live painting demonstrations at galleries, as well as benefit nights to help organizations such as 826 Valencia. He has a show up at ArtHaus in San Francisco, which was reviewed in ARTWORKS Magazine and American Artist.

== Themes ==
Mencher depicts scenes filled with ambiguous stories, allowing the viewers to join in the creation process. Common themes include people whispering, half-full (or half-empty) drinking glasses, the visual exploration of clichés, film noir themes, sequential narratives, and thematic apperception tests.

Mencher hosts a blog on his web site, showing viewers the development of several of his paintings, including the source material he uses. He also hosts an online forum on his web site, where viewers are able to express their thoughts on his work by submitting their own poetry. Additionally, he has hosted a contest, allowing viewers to submit title suggestions for an already-completed painting (eventually titled Chromosomal Variation).

=== Controversy ===
Mencher's body of work includes female and male nudes, including larger men who are not often the subjects of such work. Gallery shows of his work have encountered resistance and controversy.

In 2003, Hang Gallery in San Francisco stopped showing his work, with the gallery director calling it "wry and perverted." In 2004, four paintings were removed from his exhibit at the California State Teachers' Retirement System office in Sacramento, after some female employees said the sexual context of the works made them uncomfortable.

== Influences ==
Mencher's work is greatly influenced by art history and literature. For example, Water Carrier of Seville by Diego Velázquez inspired his own work Water Carrier of Fremont, Caravaggio's The Calling of Saint Matthew was reimagined as Mencher's The Calling of Marc, and the realist paintings of Edward Hopper have also inspired his vision and style. The essay Death of the Author by Roland Barthes shaped Mencher's thoughts that the viewer can never precisely know what the painter intends. He also cites film noir and television as major influences on his work. Mencher often uses his wife, friends, family pets, and students as inspiration and models for his paintings, and they in turn may suggest storylines and poses for the work in progress.
