= United States Congress =

Bicameral legislature of the United States

Coordinates: 38°53′23″N 77°0′32″W

- 119th Congress
- Coat of arms of the United States

Type
- Type: Bicameral
- Houses: Senate; House of Representatives

History
- Founded: March 4, 1789 (237 years ago)
- Preceded by: Congress of the Confederation

Leadership
- President of the Senate: JD Vance (R) since January 20, 2025
- President pro tempore of the Senate: Chuck Grassley (R) since January 3, 2025
- Speaker of the House: Mike Johnson (R) since October 25, 2023

Structure
- Seats: 535 voting members; 100 senators; 435 representatives; 6 non-voting members
- Senate political groups: Majority (53): Republican (53); Minority (47): Democratic (45); Independent (2) (Note: Independent Sens. Angus King of Maine and Bernie Sanders of Vermont caucus with the Democratic Party.)
- House of Representatives political groups: Majority (219): Republican (218); Independent (1) (Note: Independent Rep. Kevin Kiley of California's 3rd congressional district caucuses with the Republican Party. Kiley was elected as a Republican.); Minority (214): Democratic (214); Vacant (2): Vacant (2)

Elections
- Last Senate election: November 3, 2026
- Last House of Representatives election: November 3, 2026
- Next Senate election: November 7, 2028
- Next House of Representatives election: November 7, 2028

Meeting place
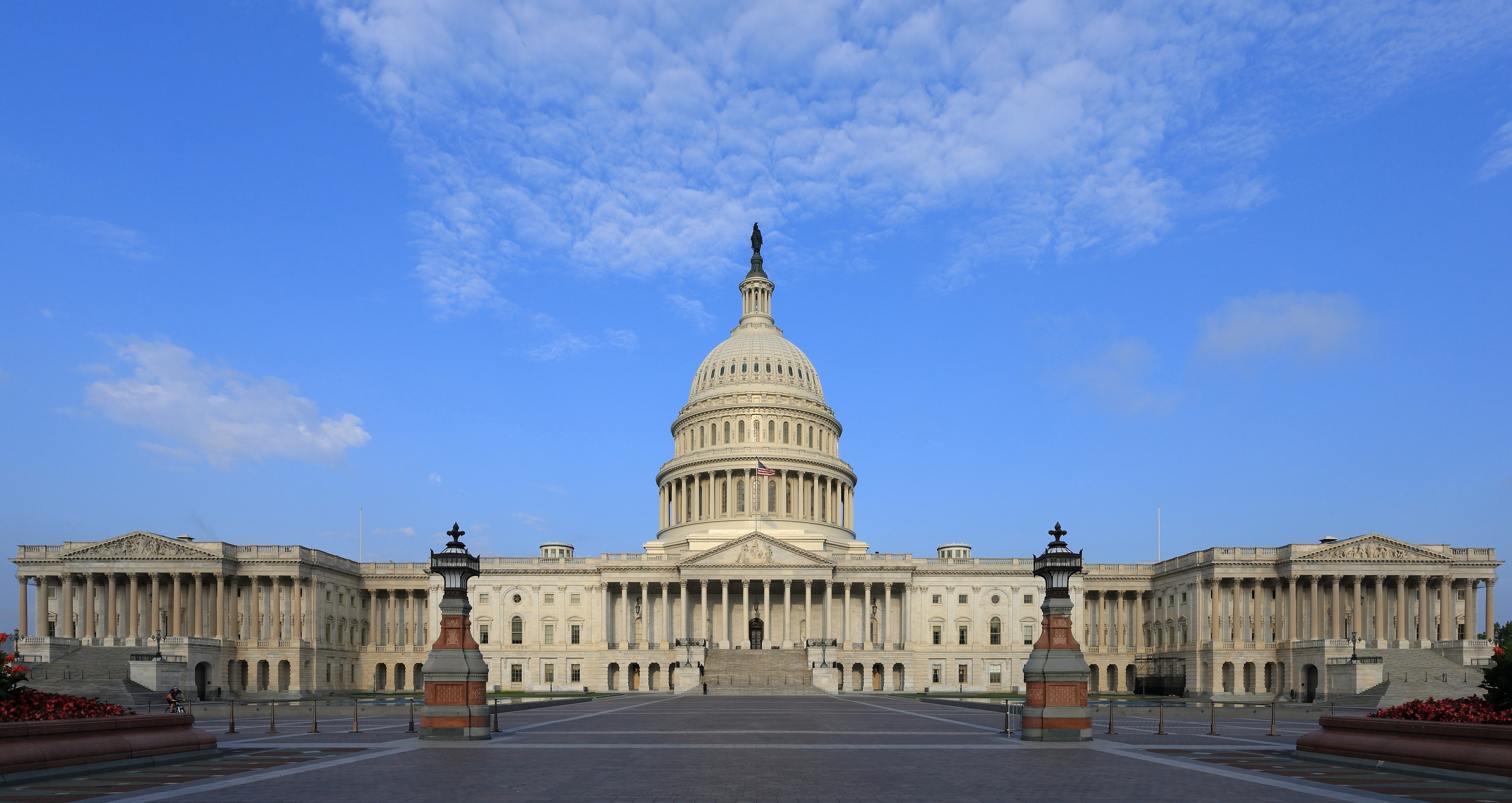
- United States Capitol; Washington, D.C. United States of America

Website
- congress.gov

Constitution
- United States Constitution, Article I

The United States Congress is the legislative branch of the federal government of the United States. It is a bicameral legislature, including a lower body, the U.S. House of Representatives, and an upper body, the U.S. Senate. They both meet in the United States Capitol in Washington, D.C.

Members of Congress are chosen through direct election, (Note: Before the ratification of the Seventeenth Amendment to the U.S. Constitution in 1913, senators were chosen by state legislatures.) though vacancies in the Senate may be filled by a governor's appointment. Congress has a total of 535 voting members: 100 senators and 435 representatives. The House of Representatives also has 6 additional non-voting members. The vice president of the United States, as president of the Senate, has a vote in the Senate only when there is a tie.

Congresses (Note: Congress does not take a grammatical article, except when referring to an individual Congress.) convene for two-year terms (a Congress), commencing every other January. Each Congress is usually split into two sessions, one for each year. Elections are held every even-numbered year on Election Day. The members of the House of Representatives are elected for the two-year term of a Congress. The Reapportionment Act of 1929 established that there be 435 representatives, and the Uniform Congressional District Act requires that they be elected from single-member constituencies or districts. It is also required that the congressional districts be apportioned among states by population every ten years using the U.S. census results, provided that each state has at least one congressional representative. Each senator is elected at-large in their state for a six-year term, with terms staggered, so every two years approximately one-third of the Senate is up for election. Each state, regardless of population or size, has two senators, so currently, there are 100 senators for the 50 states.

Article One of the Constitution requires that members of Congress be at least 25 years old for the House and at least 30 years old for the Senate, be a U.S. citizen for seven years for the House and nine years for the Senate, and be an inhabitant of the state which they represent. Members in both chambers may stand for re-election an unlimited number of times.

Congress was created by the Constitution's First Article and first met in 1789, replacing the Congress of the Confederation in its legislative function. Although not legally mandated, in practice members of Congress since the late 19th century are typically affiliated with one of the two major parties, the Democratic Party or the Republican Party, and only rarely with a third party or independents affiliated with no party. Members can also switch parties at any time, though this is uncommon.

== Overview ==
An overview of the United States legislative process from the Library of Congress

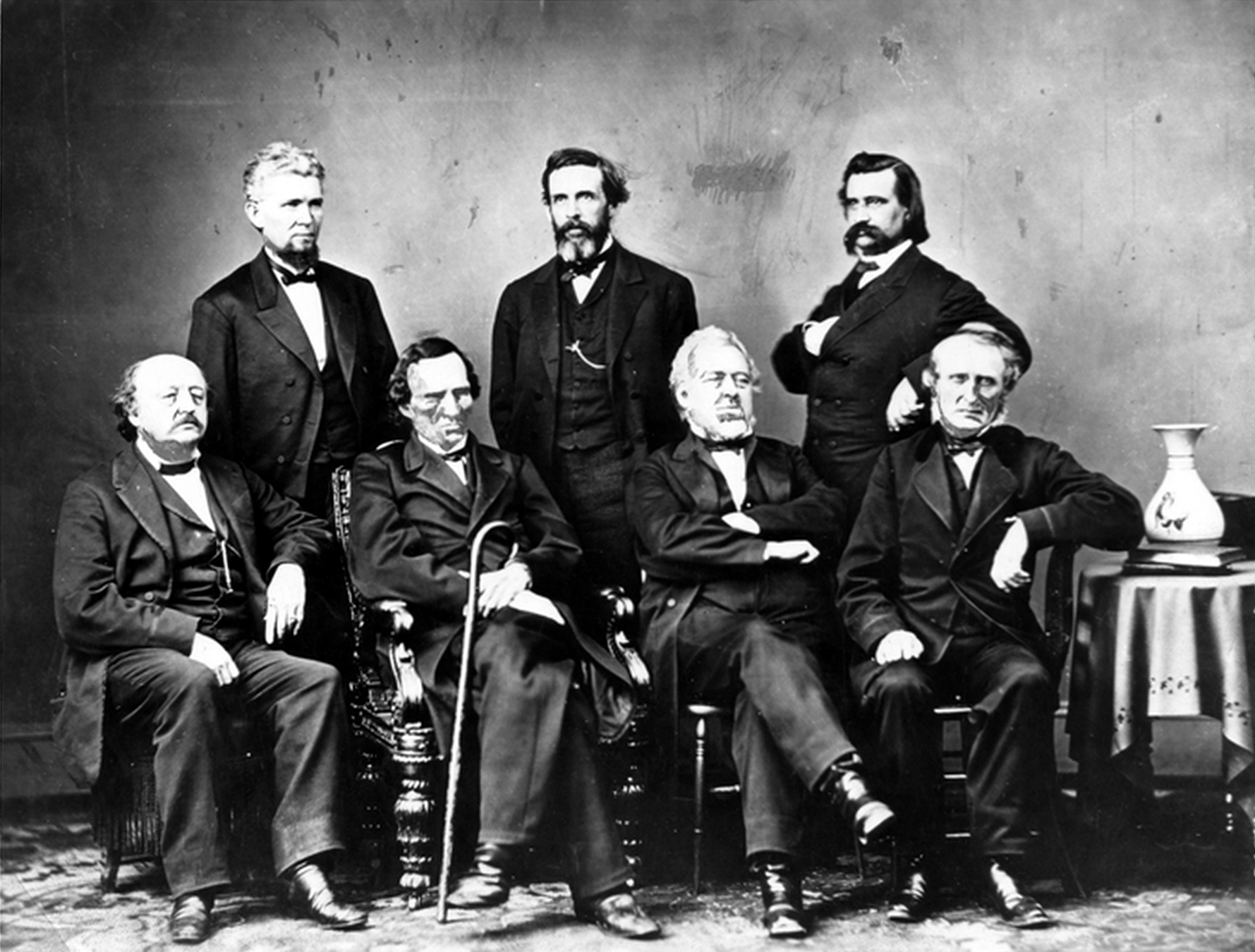
In 1868, this committee of representatives prosecuted U.S. president Andrew Johnson in his impeachment trial, but the Senate did not convict him.

Article One of the United States Constitution states, "All legislative Powers herein granted shall be vested in a Congress of the United States, which shall consist of a Senate and House of Representatives." The House and Senate are equal partners in the legislative process – legislation cannot be enacted without the consent of both chambers. The Constitution grants each chamber some unique powers. The Senate approves treaties and presidential appointments while the House initiates revenue-raising bills.

The House initiates and decides impeachment while the Senate votes on conviction and removal of office for impeachment cases. A two-thirds vote of the Senate is required before an impeached person can be removed from office.

The term Congress can also refer to a particular meeting of the legislature. A Congress covers two years; the current one, the 119th Congress, began on January 3, 2025, and will end on January 3, 2027. Since the adoption of the Twentieth Amendment to the United States Constitution, the Congress has started and ended at noon on the third day of January of every odd-numbered year. Members of the Senate are referred to as senators, while members of the House of Representatives are commonly referred to as representatives, congressmen, or congresswomen.

Congress provides both local representation of congressional districts by representatives and representation of states at-large by senators.

Scholar and representative Lee H. Hamilton asserted that the "historic mission of Congress has been to maintain freedom" and insisted it was a "driving force in American government" and a "remarkably resilient institution". Congress is the "heart and soul of our democracy", according to this view, even though legislators rarely achieve the prestige or name recognition of presidents or Supreme Court justices; one wrote that "legislators remain ghosts in America's historical imagination." One analyst argues that it is not a solely reactive institution but has played an active role in shaping government policy and is extraordinarily sensitive to public pressure. Several academics described Congress:

Congress reflects us in all our strengths and all our weaknesses. It reflects our regional idiosyncrasies, our ethnic, religious, and racial diversity, our multitude of professions, and our shadings of opinion on everything from the value of war to the war over values. Congress is the government's most representative body … Congress is essentially charged with reconciling our many points of view on the great public policy issues of the day.

Congress is constantly changing and is constantly in flux. In recent times, the American South and West have gained House seats according to demographic changes recorded by the census and includes more women and minorities. Most incumbents seek re-election, and their historical likelihood of winning subsequent elections exceeds 90 percent.

While power balances among the different parts of government continue to change, the internal structure of Congress is important to understand along with its interactions with so-called intermediary institutions such as political parties, civic associations, interest groups, and the mass media.

The historical records of the House of Representatives and the Senate are maintained by the Center for Legislative Archives, which is a part of the National Archives and Records Administration.

Congress holds legislative authority over the District of Columbia, as the current seat of the federal government. Despite the devolution of certain roles to municipal government, under the Home Rule Act, Congress has the power to 'review and disapprove' local laws before they take effect.

== History ==
=== 18th century ===
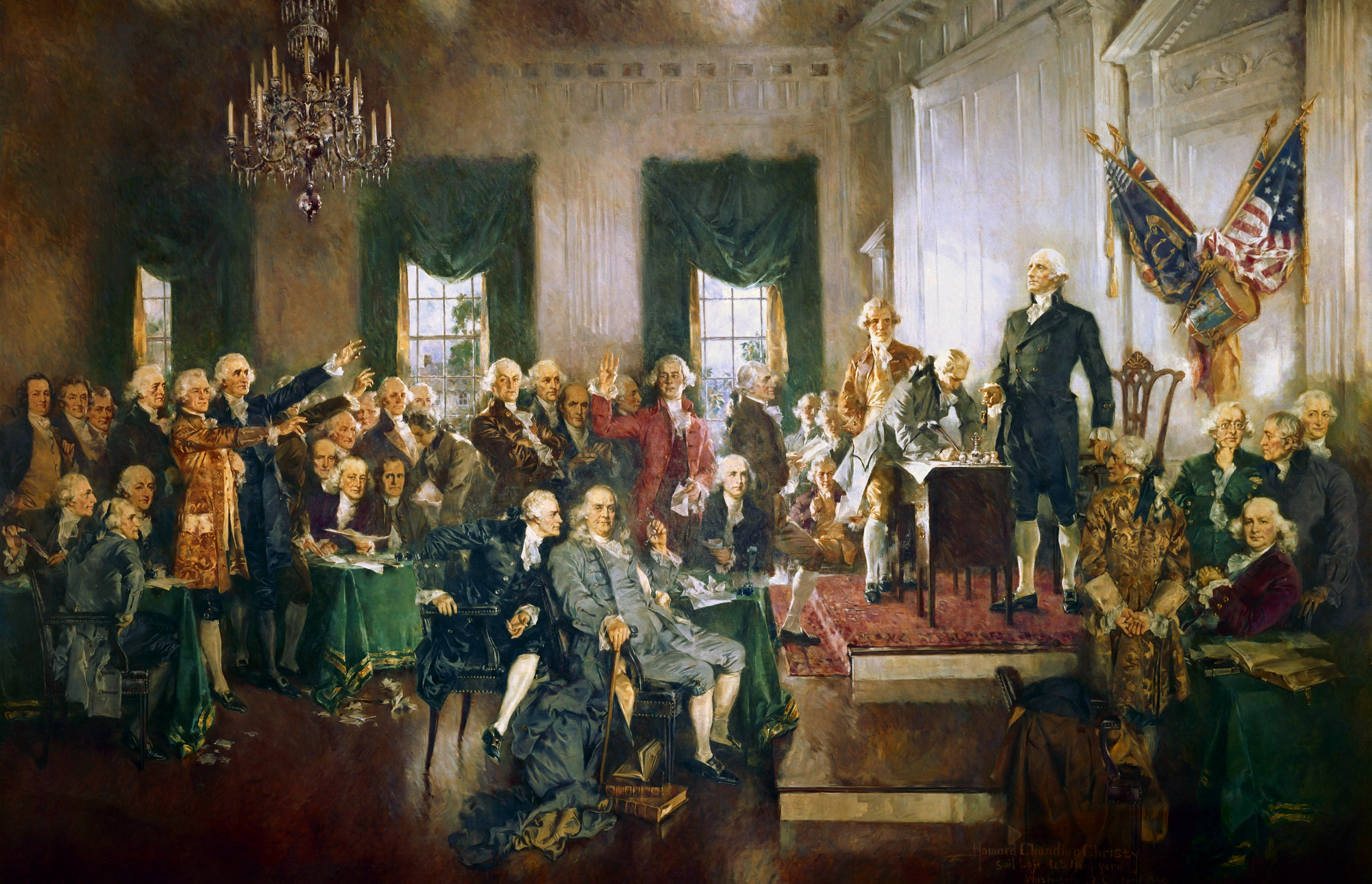
The 1940 portrait Scene at the Signing of the Constitution of the United States, depicting George Washington presiding over the signing of the Constitution of the United States

The First Continental Congress was a gathering of representatives from twelve of the Thirteen Colonies. On July 4, 1776, the Second Continental Congress adopted the Declaration of Independence, referring to the new nation as the "United States of America". The Articles of Confederation in 1781 created the Congress of the Confederation, a unicameral body with equal representation among the states in which each state had a veto over most decisions. Congress had executive but not legislative authority, and the federal judiciary was confined to admiralty and lacked authority to collect taxes, regulate commerce, or enforce laws.

Government powerlessness led to the Convention of 1787 which proposed a revised constitution with a two-chamber or bicameral Congress. Smaller states argued for equal representation for each state. The two-chamber structure had functioned well in state governments. A compromise plan, the Connecticut Compromise, was adopted with representatives chosen by population (benefiting larger states) and exactly two senators chosen by state governments (benefiting smaller states).

The ratified constitution created a federal structure with two overlapping power centers so that each citizen as an individual is subject to the powers of state government and national government. To protect against abuse of power, each branch of government – executive, legislative, and judicial – had a separate sphere of authority and could check other branches according to the principle of the separation of powers. Furthermore, there were checks and balances within the legislature since there were two separate chambers. The new government became active in 1789.

Political scientist Julian E. Zelizer suggested there were four main congressional eras, with considerable overlap, and included the formative era (1780s–1820s), the partisan era (1830s–1900s), the committee era (1910s–1960s), and the contemporary era (1970–present).

Federalists and anti-federalists jostled for power in the early years as political parties became pronounced. With the passage of the Constitution and the Bill of Rights, the anti-federalist movement was exhausted. Some activists joined the Anti-Administration Party that James Madison and Thomas Jefferson were forming about 1790–1791 to oppose policies of Treasury Secretary Alexander Hamilton; it soon became the Democratic-Republican Party or the Jeffersonian Republican Party and thus began the era of the First Party System.

=== 19th century ===
In 1800, Thomas Jefferson's election to the presidency marked a peaceful transition of power between the parties. John Marshall, 4th chief justice of the Supreme Court, empowered the courts by establishing the principle of judicial review in law in the landmark case Marbury v. Madison in 1803, effectively giving the Supreme Court a power to nullify congressional legislation.

The Civil War, which lasted from 1861 to 1865, resolved the slavery issue and unified the nation under federal authority but weakened the power of states' rights. The Gilded Age (1877–1901) was marked by Republican dominance of Congress. During this time, lobbying activity became more intense, particularly during the administration of President Ulysses S. Grant in which influential lobbies advocated for railroad subsidies and tariffs on wool. Immigration and high birth rates swelled the ranks of citizens and the nation grew at a rapid pace. The Progressive Era was characterized by strong party leadership in both houses of Congress and calls for reform; sometimes reformers said lobbyists corrupted politics. The position of Speaker of the House became extremely powerful under leaders such as Thomas Reed in 1890 and Joseph Gurney Cannon.

=== 20th century ===
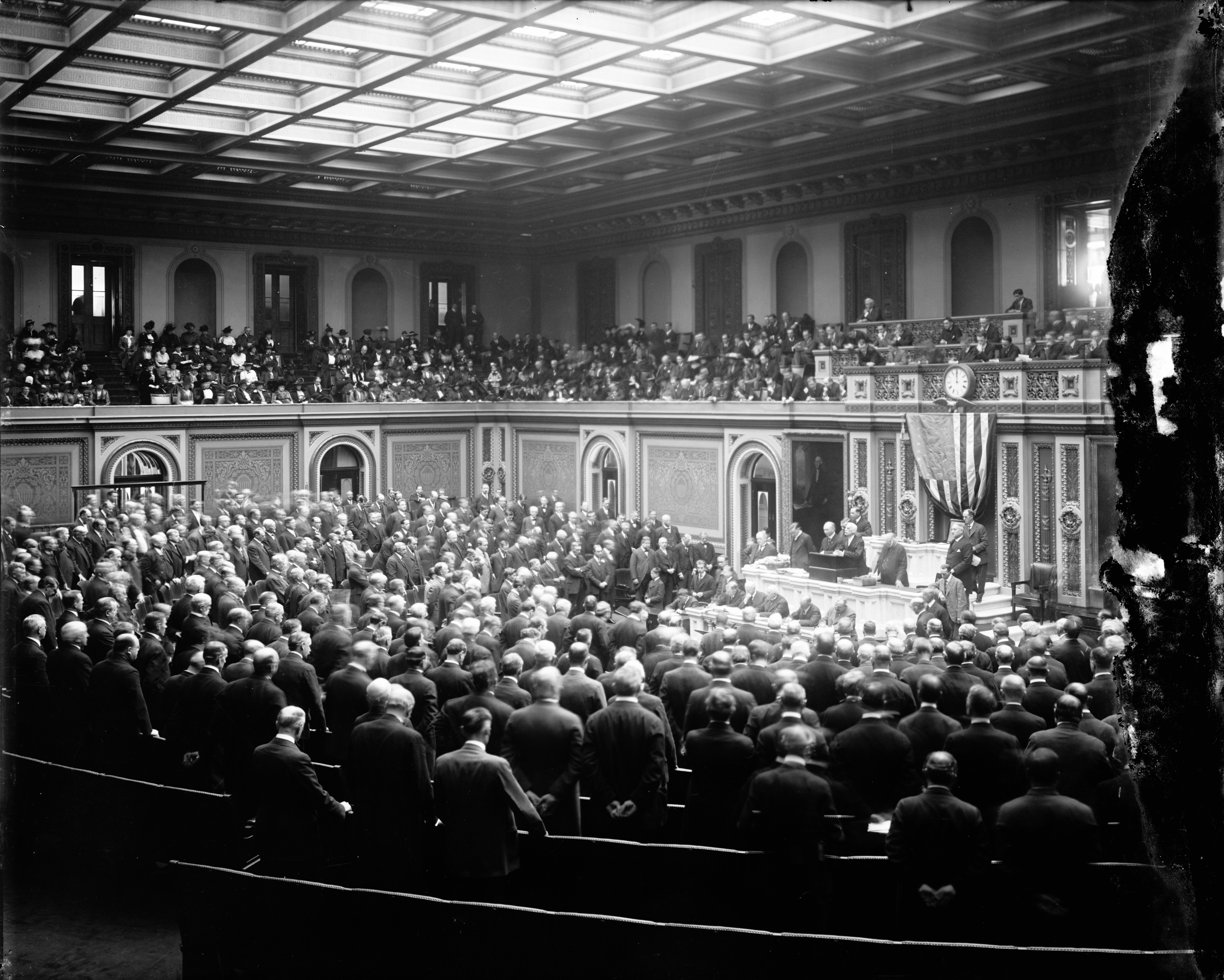
The United States Congress, c. 1915

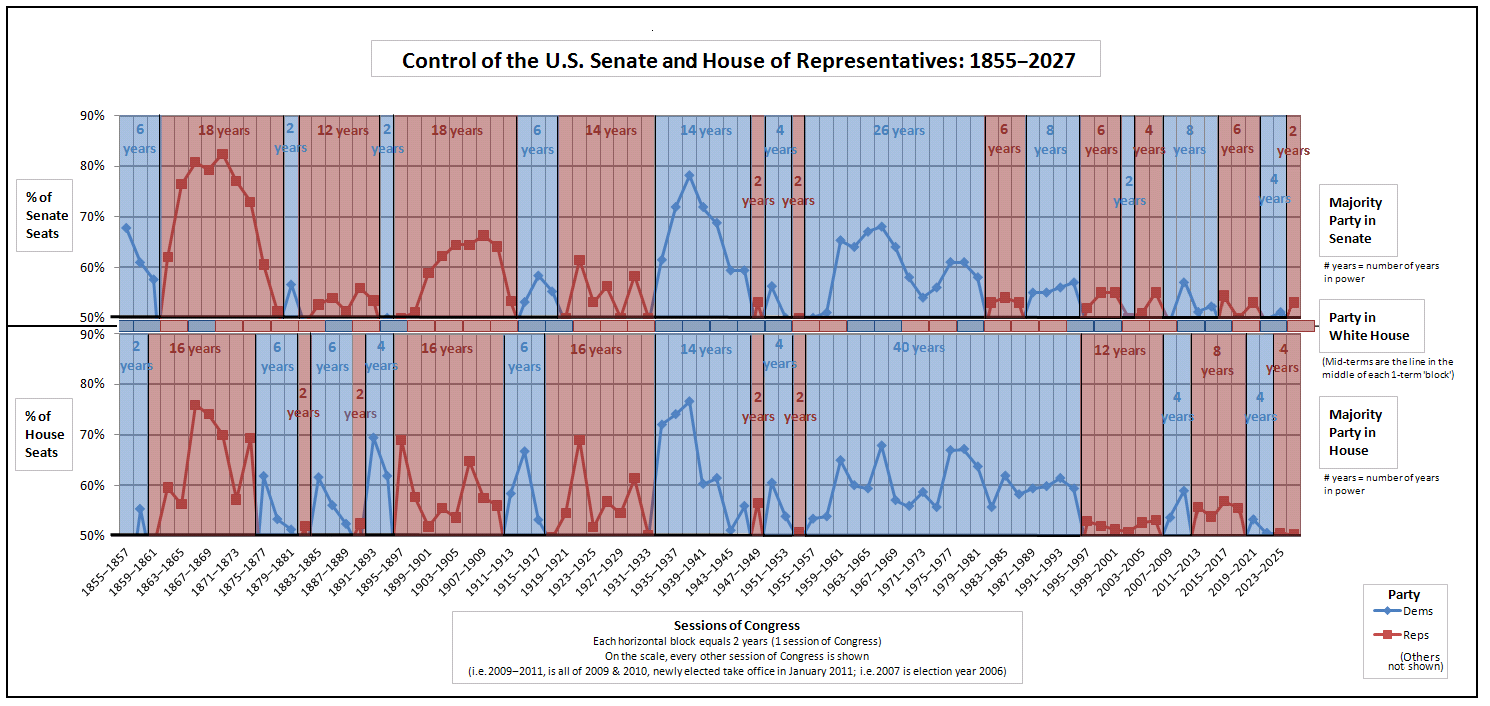
Party control of the Senate, House, and Presidency, 1855 to 2025.

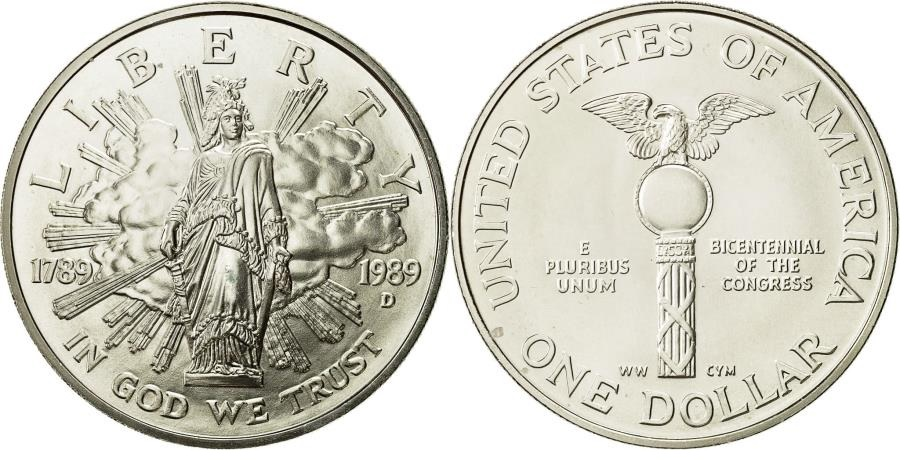
The 200th anniversary of Congress in 1989, which was honored by United States Congress Bicentennial commemorative coins

By the beginning of the 20th century, party structures and leadership emerged as key organizers of Senate proceedings.

A system of seniority, in which long-time members of Congress gained more and more power, encouraged politicians of both parties to seek long terms. Committee chairmen remained influential in both houses until the reforms of the 1970s.

Important structural changes included the direct popular election of senators according to the Seventeenth Amendment, ratified on April 8, 1913. Supreme Court decisions based on the Constitution's commerce clause expanded congressional power to regulate the economy. One effect of popular election of senators was to reduce the difference between the House and Senate in terms of their link to the electorate. Lame duck reforms according to the Twentieth Amendment reduced the power of defeated and retiring members of Congress to wield influence despite their lack of accountability.

The Great Depression ushered in President Franklin Roosevelt and strong control by Democrats and historic New Deal policies. Roosevelt's election in 1932 marked a shift in government power towards the executive branch. Numerous New Deal initiatives came from the White House rather than being initiated by Congress. President Roosevelt pushed his agenda in Congress by detailing Executive Branch staff to friendly Senate committees, a practice that ended with the Legislative Reorganization Act of 1946.

The Democratic Party controlled both houses of Congress for many years. During this time, Republicans and conservative southern Democrats formed the Conservative Coalition. Democrats maintained control of Congress during World War II. Congress struggled with efficiency in the postwar era partly by reducing the number of standing congressional committees.

Southern Democrats became a powerful force in many influential committees although political power alternated between Republicans and Democrats during these years. More complex issues required greater specialization and expertise, such as space flight and atomic energy policy. Senator Joseph McCarthy exploited the fear of communism during the Second Red Scare and conducted televised hearings. In 1960, Democratic candidate John F. Kennedy narrowly won the presidency and power shifted again to the Democrats who dominated both chambers of Congress from 1961 to 1980, and retained a consistent majority in the House from 1955 to 1994.

Congress enacted Johnson's Great Society program to fight poverty and hunger. The Watergate Scandal had a powerful effect of waking up a somewhat dormant Congress which investigated presidential wrongdoing and coverups; the scandal "substantially reshaped" relations between the branches of government, suggested political scientist Bruce J. Schulman. Partisanship returned, particularly after 1994; one analyst attributes partisan infighting to slim congressional majorities which discouraged friendly social gatherings in meeting rooms such as the Board of Education. Congress began reasserting its authority.

Lobbying became a big factor despite the 1971 Federal Election Campaign Act. Political action committees or PACs could make substantive donations to congressional candidates via such means as soft money contributions. While soft money funds were not given to specific campaigns for candidates, the money often benefited candidates substantially in an indirect way and helped reelect candidates. Reforms such as the 2002 Bipartisan Campaign Reform Act limited campaign donations but did not limit soft money contributions. One source suggests post-Watergate laws amended in 1974 meant to reduce the "influence of wealthy contributors and end payoffs" instead "legitimized PACs" since they "enabled individuals to band together in support of candidates".

From 1974 to 1984, PACs grew from 608 to 3,803 and donations leaped from $12.5 million to $120 million along with concern over PAC influence in Congress. In 2009, there were 4,600 business, labor and special-interest PACs including ones for lawyers, electricians, and real estate brokers. From 2007 to 2008, 175 members of Congress received "half or more of their campaign cash" from PACs.

From 1970 to 2009, the House expanded delegates, along with their powers and privileges representing U.S. citizens in non-state areas, beginning with representation on committees for Puerto Rico's resident commissioner in 1970. In 1971, a delegate for the District of Columbia was authorized, and in 1972 new delegate positions were established for U.S. Virgin Islands and Guam. In 1978, an additional delegate for American Samoa were added.

In the late 20th century, the media became more important in Congress's work. Analyst Michael Schudson suggested that greater publicity undermined the power of political parties and caused "more roads to open up in Congress for individual representatives to influence decisions". Norman Ornstein suggested that media prominence led to a greater emphasis on the negative and sensational side of Congress, and referred to this as the tabloidization of media coverage. Others saw pressure to squeeze a political position into a thirty-second soundbite. A report characterized Congress in 2013 as unproductive, gridlocked, and "setting records for futility".

In October 2013, with Congress unable to compromise, the government was shut down for several weeks and risked a serious default on debt payments, causing 60% of the public to say they would "fire every member of Congress" including their own representative. One report suggested Congress posed the "biggest risk to the U.S. economy" because of its brinksmanship, "down-to-the-wire budget and debt crises" and "indiscriminate spending cuts", resulting in slowed economic activity and keeping up to two million people unemployed. There has been increasing public dissatisfaction with Congress, with extremely low approval ratings which dropped to 5% in October 2013.

=== 21st century ===
Over decades, the age distribution of members of the US Congress has trended toward older individuals.

Though the age difference between incoming and departing senators in 2027 was nearly 15 years, the overall average age declined less than a year because of the aging of those continuing their terms.

Each year, the USCP investigates thousands of "concerning statements" and direct threats against Members of Congress, their families, and staff. The number of such cases has grown since the mid-2010s.

In 2009, Congress authorized another delegate for the Northern Mariana Islands. These 6 members of Congress enjoy floor privileges to introduce bills and resolutions, and in recent Congresses they vote in permanent and select committees, in party caucuses and in joint conferences with the Senate. They have Capitol Hill offices, staff and two annual appointments to each of the four military academies. While their votes are constitutional when Congress authorizes their House Committee of the Whole votes, recent Congresses have not allowed for that, and they cannot vote when the House is meeting as the House of Representatives.

On January 6, 2021, Congress gathered to confirm the election of Joe Biden, when supporters of the outgoing president Donald Trump attacked the building. The session of Congress ended prematurely, and Congress representatives evacuated. Trump supporters occupied Congress until D.C. police evacuated the area. The event was the first time since the burning of Washington by the British during the War of 1812 that the United States Congress was forcefully occupied.

== Women in Congress ==
Further information: Women in the United States House of Representatives and Women in the United States Senate

Various social and structural barriers have prevented women from gaining seats in Congress. In the early 20th century, women's domestic roles and the inability to vote forestalled opportunities to run for and hold public office. The two party system and the lack of term limits favored incumbent white men, making the widow's succession – in which a woman temporarily took over a seat vacated by the death of her husband – the most common path to Congress for white women.

Women candidates began making substantial inroads in the later 20th century, due in part to new political support mechanisms and public awareness of their underrepresentation in Congress. Recruitment and financial support for women candidates were rare until the second-wave feminism movement, when activists moved into electoral politics. Beginning in the 1970s, donors and political action committees like EMILY's List began recruiting, training and funding women candidates. Watershed political moments like the confirmation of Clarence Thomas and the 2016 presidential election created momentum for women candidates, resulting in the Year of the Woman and the election of members of The Squad, respectively.

Women of color faced additional challenges that made their ascension to Congress even more difficult. Jim Crow laws, voter suppression and other forms of structural racism made it virtually impossible for women of color to reach Congress prior to 1965. The passage of the Voting Rights Act that year, and the elimination of race-based immigration laws in the 1960s opened the possibility for Black, Asian American, Latina and other non-white women candidates to run for Congress.

Racially polarized voting, racial stereotypes and lack of institutional support still prevent women of color from reaching Congress as easily as white people. Senate elections, which require victories in statewide electorates, have been particularly difficult for women of color. Carol Moseley Braun became the first woman of color to reach the Senate in 1993. The second, Mazie Hirono, won in 2013.

In 2021, Kamala Harris became the first female President of the Senate, which came with her role as the first female Vice President of the United States.

== Role ==
=== Powers ===
==== Overview ====
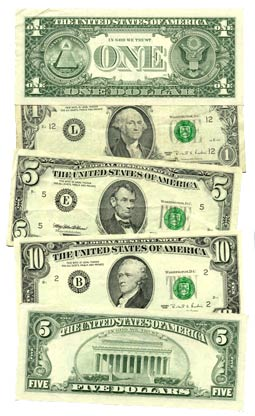
Congress's power of the purse, which authorizes it to tax citizens, spend money, and print currency

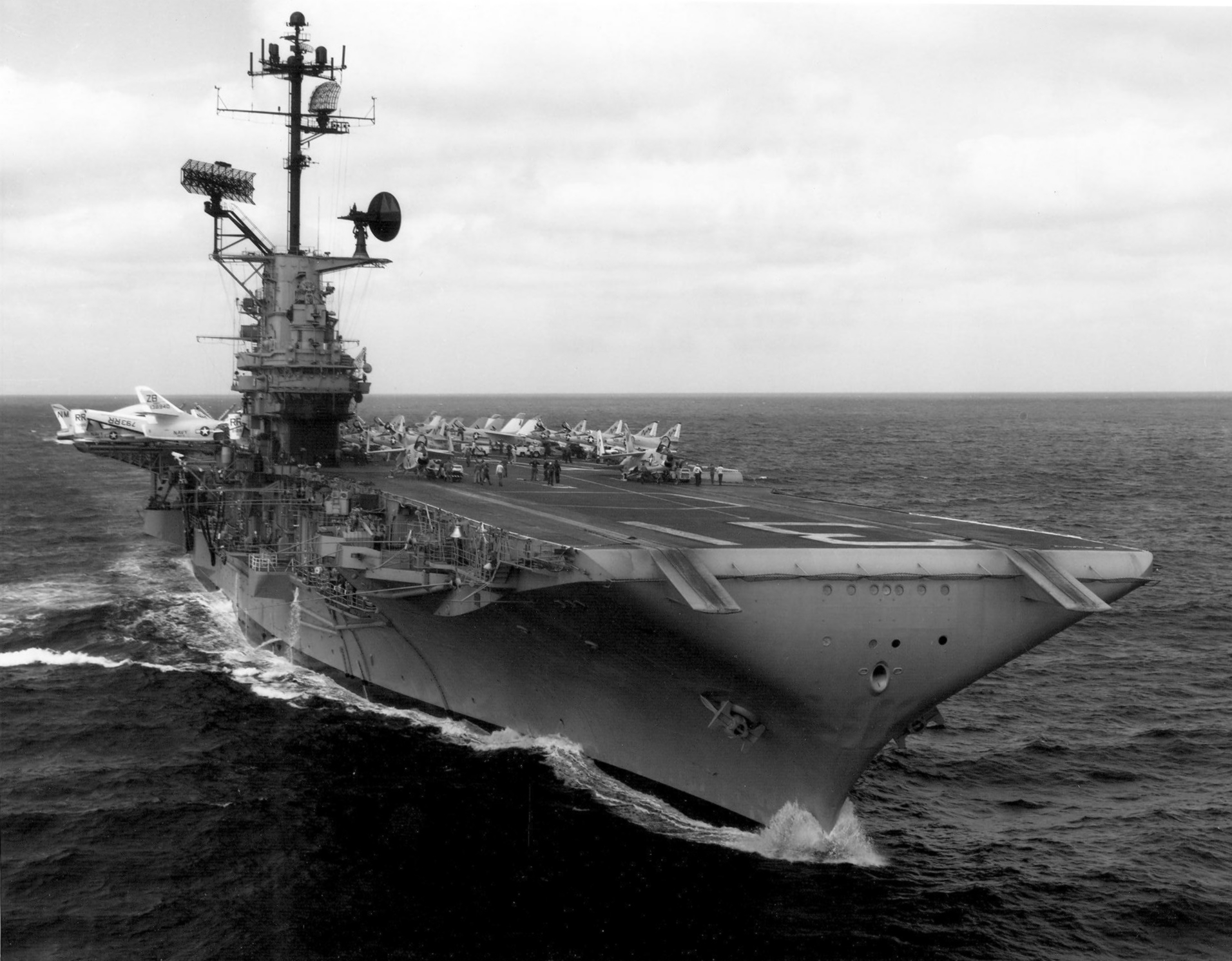
Congress authorizes defense spending, such as the purchase of the USS Bon Homme Richard (CV-31)

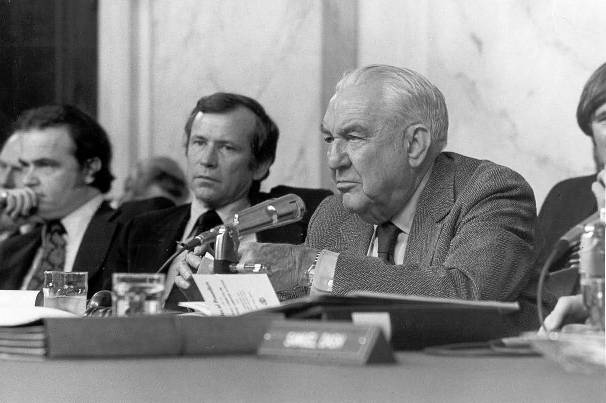
The Senate Watergate Committee, investigating President Nixon and the Watergate scandal from 1973 to 1974

Article One of the Constitution creates and sets forth the structure and most of the powers of Congress. Sections One through Six describe how Congress is elected and gives each House the power to create its own structure. Section Seven lays out the process for creating laws, and Section Eight enumerates numerous powers. Section Nine is a list of powers Congress does not have, and Section Ten enumerates powers of the state, some of which may only be granted by Congress. Constitutional amendments have granted Congress additional powers. Congress also has implied powers derived from the Constitution's Necessary and Proper Clause.

Congress has authority over financial and budgetary policy through the enumerated power to "lay and collect Taxes, Duties, Imposts and Excises, to pay the Debts and provide for the common Defence and general Welfare of the United States". There is vast authority over budgets, although analyst Eric Patashnik suggested that much of Congress's power to manage the budget has been lost when the welfare state expanded since "entitlements were institutionally detached from Congress's ordinary legislative routine and rhythm." Another factor leading to less control over the budget was a Keynesian belief that balanced budgets were unnecessary.

The Sixteenth Amendment in 1913 extended congressional power of taxation to include income taxes without apportionment among the several States, and without regard to any census or enumeration. The Constitution also grants Congress the exclusive power to appropriate funds, and this power of the purse is one of Congress's primary checks on the executive branch. Congress can borrow money on the credit of the United States, regulate commerce with foreign nations and among the states, and coin money. Generally, the Senate and the House of Representatives have equal legislative authority, although only the House may originate revenue and appropriation bills.

Congress has an important role in national defense, including the exclusive power to declare war, to raise and maintain the armed forces, and to make rules for the military. Some critics charge that the executive branch has usurped Congress's constitutionally defined task of declaring war. While historically presidents initiated the process for going to war, they asked for and received formal war declarations from Congress for the War of 1812, the Mexican–American War, the Spanish–American War, World War I, and World War II, although President Theodore Roosevelt's military move into Panama in 1903 did not get congressional approval. In the early days after the North Korean invasion of 1950, President Truman described the American response as a "police action". According to Time magazine in 1970, "U.S. presidents [had] ordered troops into position or action without a formal congressional declaration a total of 149 times." In 1993, Michael Kinsley wrote that "Congress's war power has become the most flagrantly disregarded provision in the Constitution," and that the "real erosion [of Congress's war power] began after World War II." Disagreement about the extent of congressional versus presidential power regarding war has been present periodically throughout the nation's history.

Congress can establish post offices and post roads, issue patents and copyrights, fix standards of weights and measures, establish Courts inferior to the Supreme Court, and "make all Laws which shall be necessary and proper for carrying into Execution the foregoing Powers, and all other Powers vested by this Constitution in the Government of the United States, or in any Department or Officer thereof". Article Four gives Congress the power to admit new states into the Union.

One of Congress's foremost non-legislative functions is the power to investigate and oversee the executive branch. Congressional oversight is usually delegated to committees and is facilitated by Congress's subpoena power. Some critics have charged that Congress has in some instances failed to do an adequate job of overseeing the other branches of government. In the Plame affair, critics including Representative Henry A. Waxman charged that Congress was not doing an adequate job of oversight in this case. There have been concerns about congressional oversight of executive actions such as warrantless wiretapping, although others respond that Congress did investigate the legality of presidential decisions. Political scientists Ornstein and Mann suggested that oversight functions do not help members of Congress win reelection. Congress also has the exclusive power of removal, allowing impeachment and removal of the president, federal judges and other federal officers. There have been charges that presidents acting under the doctrine of the unitary executive have assumed important legislative and budgetary powers that should belong to Congress. So-called signing statements are one way in which a president can "tip the balance of power between Congress and the White House a little more in favor of the executive branch", according to one account. Past presidents, including Ronald Reagan, George H. W. Bush, Bill Clinton, and George W. Bush, have made public statements when signing congressional legislation about how they understand a bill or plan to execute it, and commentators, including the American Bar Association, have described this practice as against the spirit of the Constitution. There have been concerns that presidential authority to cope with financial crises is eclipsing the power of Congress. In 2008, George F. Will called the Capitol building a "tomb for the antiquated idea that the legislative branch matters".

==== Enumeration ====
The Constitution enumerates the powers of Congress in detail. In addition, other congressional powers have been granted, or confirmed, by constitutional amendments. The Thirteenth (1865), Fourteenth (1868), and Fifteenth Amendments (1870) gave Congress authority to enact legislation to enforce rights of African Americans, including voting rights, due process, and equal protection under the law. Generally militia forces are controlled by state governments, not Congress.

==== Implicit, commerce clause ====
Congress also has implied powers deriving from the Constitution's Necessary and Proper Clause which permit Congress to "make all laws which shall be necessary and proper for carrying into Execution the foregoing Powers, and all other Powers vested by this Constitution in the Government of the United States, or in any Department or Officer thereof". Broad interpretations of this clause and of the Commerce Clause, the enumerated power to regulate commerce, in rulings such as McCulloch v. Maryland, have effectively widened the scope of Congress's legislative authority far beyond that prescribed in Section Eight.

==== Territorial government ====
Constitutional responsibility for the oversight of Washington, D.C., the federal district and national capital, and the U.S. territories of Guam, American Samoa, Puerto Rico, the U.S. Virgin Islands, and the Northern Mariana Islands rests with Congress. The republican form of government in territories is devolved by congressional statute to the respective territories including direct election of governors, the D.C. mayor and locally elective territorial legislatures.

Each territory and Washington, D.C., elects a non-voting delegate to the U.S. House of Representatives as they have throughout congressional history. They "possess the same powers as other members of the House, except that they may not vote when the House is meeting as the House of Representatives". They are assigned offices and allowances for staff, participate in debate, and appoint constituents to the four military service academies for the Army, Navy, Air Force and Coast Guard.

Washington, D.C., citizens alone among U.S. territories have the right to directly vote for the President of the United States, although the Democratic and Republican political parties nominate their presidential candidates at national conventions which include delegates from the five major territories.

=== Checks and balances ===
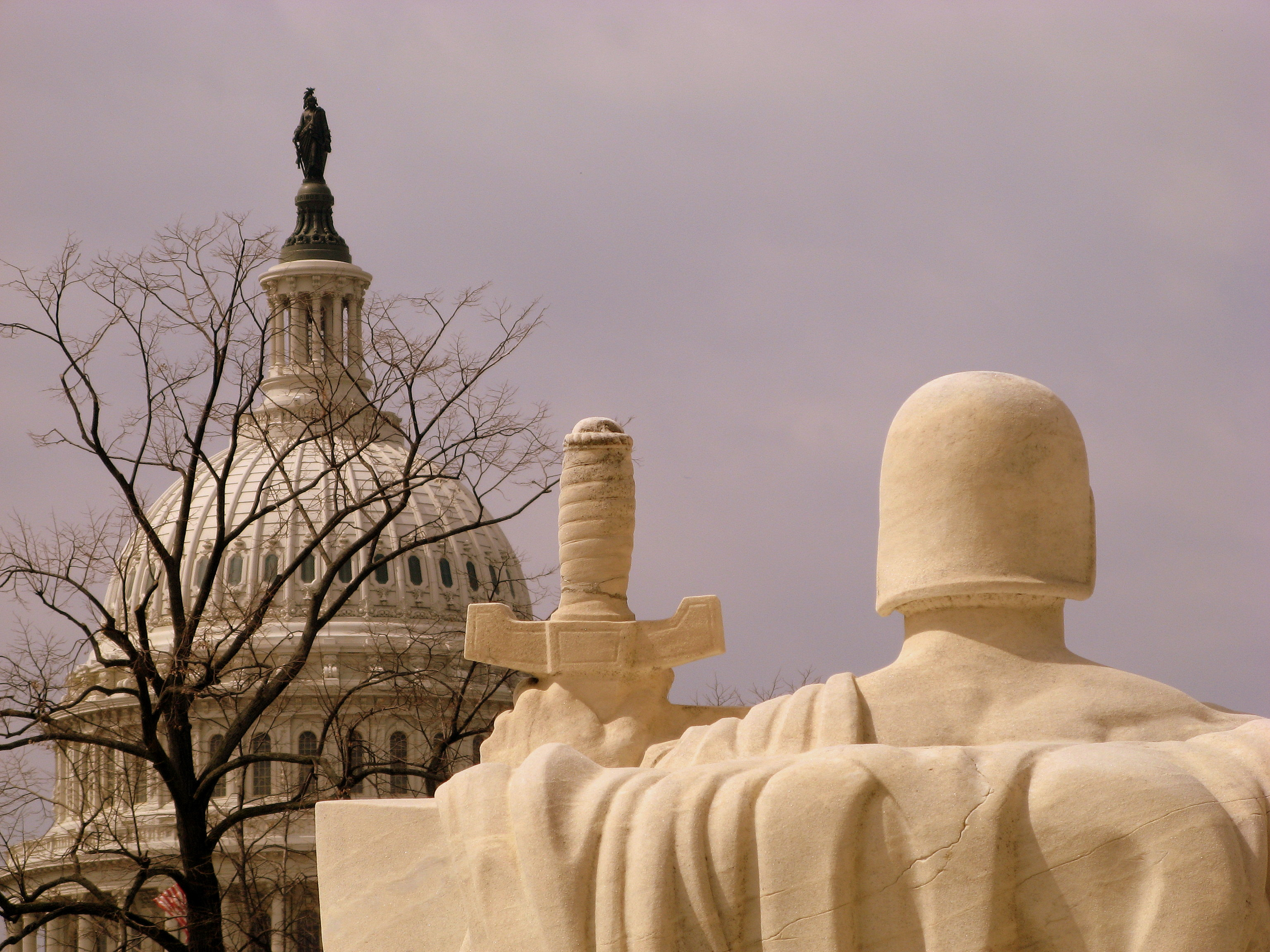
The United States Capitol seen from the United States Supreme Court building

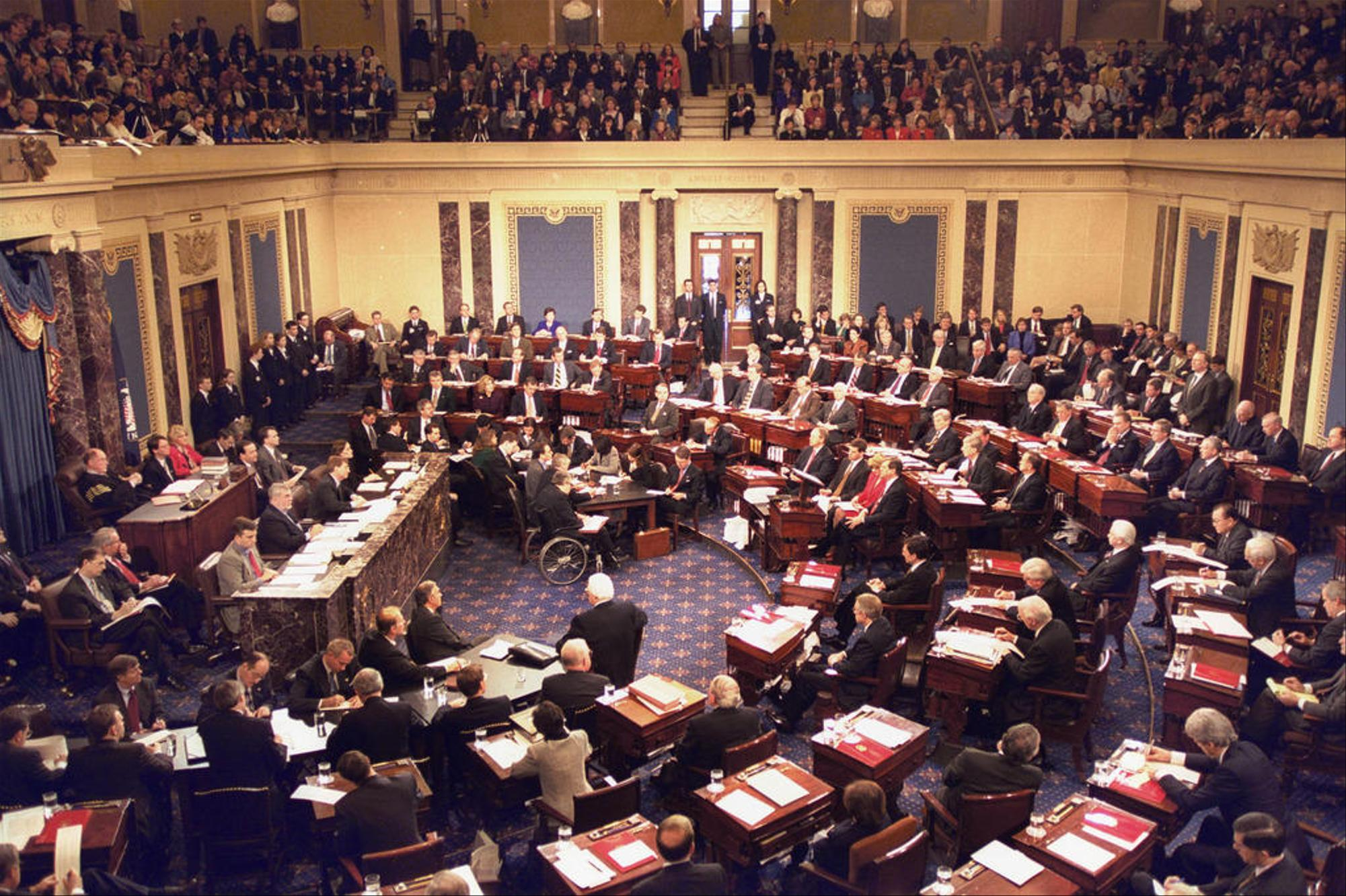
The impeachment trial of President Clinton in 1999, presided over by Chief Justice William Rehnquist

Representative Lee H. Hamilton explained how Congress functions within the federal government:

To me the key to understanding it is balance. The founders went to great lengths to balance institutions against each other – balancing powers among the three branches: Congress, the president, and the Supreme Court; between the House of Representatives and the Senate; between the federal government and the states; among states of different sizes and regions with different interests; between the powers of government and the rights of citizens, as spelled out in the Bill of Rights ... No one part of government dominates the other.

The Constitution provides checks and balances among the three branches of the federal government. Its authors expected the greater power to lie with Congress as described in Article One.

The influence of Congress on the presidency has varied from period to period depending on factors such as congressional leadership, presidential political influence, historical circumstances such as war, and individual initiative by members of Congress. The impeachment of Andrew Johnson made the presidency less powerful than Congress for a considerable period afterwards. The 20th and 21st centuries have seen the rise of presidential power under politicians such as Theodore Roosevelt, Woodrow Wilson, Franklin D. Roosevelt, Richard Nixon, Ronald Reagan, and George W. Bush. Congress restricted presidential power with laws such as the Congressional Budget and Impoundment Control Act of 1974 and the War Powers Resolution. The presidency remains considerably more powerful today than during the 19th century. Executive branch officials are often loath to reveal sensitive information to members of Congress because of concern that information could not be kept secret; in return, knowing they may be in the dark about executive branch activity, congressional officials are more likely to distrust their counterparts in executive agencies. Many government actions require fast coordinated effort by many agencies, and this is a task that Congress is ill-suited for. Congress is slow, open, divided, and not well matched to handle more rapid executive action or do a good job of overseeing such activity, according to one analysis.

The Constitution concentrates removal powers in the Congress by empowering and obligating the House of Representatives to impeach executive or judicial officials for "Treason, Bribery, or other high Crimes and Misdemeanors". Impeachment is a formal accusation of unlawful activity by a civil officer or government official. The Senate is constitutionally empowered and obligated to try all impeachments. A simple majority in the House is required to impeach an official; a two-thirds majority in the Senate is required for conviction. A convicted official is automatically removed from office; in addition, the Senate may stipulate that the defendant be banned from holding office in the future. Impeachment proceedings may not inflict more than this. A convicted party may face criminal penalties in a normal court of law. In the history of the United States, the House of Representatives has impeached sixteen officials, of whom seven were convicted. Another resigned before the Senate could complete the trial. Only three presidents have ever been impeached: Andrew Johnson in 1868, Bill Clinton in 1999, Donald Trump in 2019 and 2021. The trials of Johnson, Clinton, and the 2019 trial of Trump all ended in acquittal; in Johnson's case, the Senate fell one vote short of the two-thirds majority required for conviction. In 1974, Richard Nixon resigned from office after impeachment proceedings in the House Judiciary Committee indicated his removal from office.

The Senate has an important check on the executive power by confirming Cabinet officials, judges, and other high officers "by and with the Advice and Consent of the Senate". It confirms most presidential nominees, but rejections are not uncommon. Furthermore, treaties negotiated by the President must be ratified by a two-thirds majority vote in the Senate to take effect. As a result, presidential arm-twisting of senators can happen before a key vote; for example, President Obama's secretary of state, Hillary Clinton, urged her former senate colleagues to approve a nuclear arms treaty with Russia in 2010. The House of Representatives has no formal role in either the ratification of treaties or the appointment of federal officials, other than in filling a vacancy in the office of the vice president; in such a case, a majority vote in each House is required to confirm a president's nomination of a vice president.

In 1803, the Supreme Court established judicial review of federal legislation in Marbury v. Madison, holding that Congress could not grant unconstitutional power to the Court itself. The Constitution did not explicitly state that the courts may exercise judicial review. The notion that courts could declare laws unconstitutional was envisioned by the founding fathers. Alexander Hamilton, for example, mentioned and expounded upon the doctrine in Federalist No. 78. Originalists on the Supreme Court have argued that if the constitution does not say something explicitly it is unconstitutional to infer what it should, might, or could have said. Judicial review means that the Supreme Court can nullify a congressional law. It is a huge check by the courts on the legislative authority and limits congressional power substantially. In 1857, for example, the Supreme Court struck down provisions of a congressional act of 1820 in its Dred Scott decision. At the same time, the Supreme Court can extend congressional power through its constitutional interpretations.

The congressional inquiry into St. Clair's Defeat of 1791 was the first congressional investigation of the executive branch. Investigations are conducted to gather information on the need for future legislation, to test the effectiveness of laws already passed, and to inquire into the qualifications and performance of members and officials of the other branches. Committees may hold hearings, and, if necessary, subpoena people to testify when investigating issues over which it has the power to legislate. Witnesses who refuse to testify may be cited for contempt of Congress, and those who testify falsely may be charged with perjury. Most committee hearings are open to the public (the House and Senate intelligence committees are the exception); important hearings are widely reported in the mass media and transcripts published a few months afterwards. Congress, in the course of studying possible laws and investigating matters, generates an incredible amount of information in various forms, and can be described as a publisher. Indeed, it publishes House and Senate reports and maintains databases which are updated irregularly with publications in a variety of electronic formats.

Congress also plays a role in presidential elections. Both Houses meet in joint session on the sixth day of January following a presidential election to count the electoral votes, and there are procedures to follow if no candidate wins a majority.

The main result of congressional activity is the creation of laws, most of which are contained in the United States Code, arranged by subject matter alphabetically under fifty title headings to present the laws "in a concise and usable form".

== Structure ==
Congress is split into two chambers – House and Senate – and manages the task of writing national legislation by dividing work into separate committees which specialize in different areas. Some members of Congress are elected by their peers to be officers of these committees. Congress has ancillary organizations such as the Government Accountability Office and the Library of Congress to help provide it with information, and members of Congress have staff and offices to assist them as well. In addition, a vast industry of lobbyists helps members write legislation on behalf of diverse corporate and labor interests.

=== Committees ===
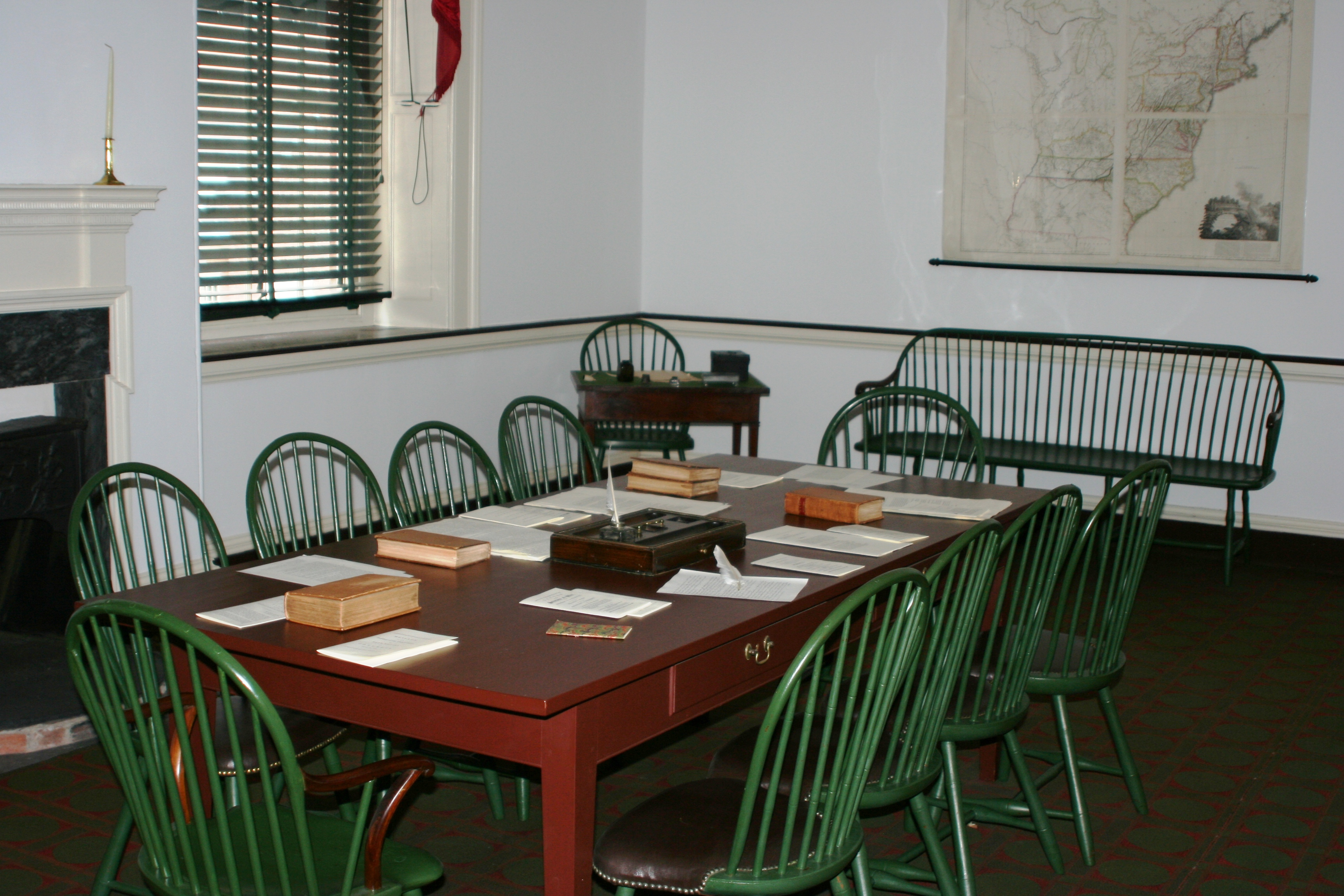
The second committee room at Congress Hall in Philadelphia

A Library of Congress video explaining the committees of the United States Congress

==== Specializations ====
The committee structure permits members of Congress to study a particular subject intensely. It is neither expected nor possible that a member be an expert on all subject areas before Congress. As time goes by, members develop expertise in particular subjects and their legal aspects. Committees investigate specialized subjects and advise the entire Congress about choices and trade-offs. The choice of specialty may be influenced by the member's constituency, important regional issues, prior background and experience. Senators often choose a different specialty from that of the other senator from their state to prevent overlap. Some committees specialize in running the business of other committees and exert a powerful influence over all legislation; for example, the House Ways and Means Committee has considerable influence over House affairs.

==== Power ====
Committees write legislation. While procedures, such as the House discharge petition process, can introduce bills to the House floor and effectively bypass committee input, they are exceedingly difficult to implement without committee action. Committees have power and have been called independent fiefdoms. Legislative, oversight, and internal administrative tasks are divided among about two hundred committees and subcommittees which gather information, evaluate alternatives, and identify problems. They propose solutions for consideration by the full chamber. In addition, they perform the function of oversight by monitoring the executive branch and investigating wrongdoing.

==== Officer ====
At the start of each two-year session, the House elects a speaker who does not normally preside over debates but serves as the majority party's leader. In the Senate, the vice president is the ex officio president of the Senate. In addition, the Senate elects an officer called the president pro tempore. Pro tempore means for the time being. This office is usually held by the most senior member of the Senate's majority party and customarily keeps this position until there is a change in party control. Accordingly, the Senate does not necessarily elect a new president pro tempore at the beginning of a new Congress. In the House and Senate, the actual presiding officer is generally a junior member of the majority party, appointed on a rotating basis.

=== Support services ===
==== Library of Congress ====
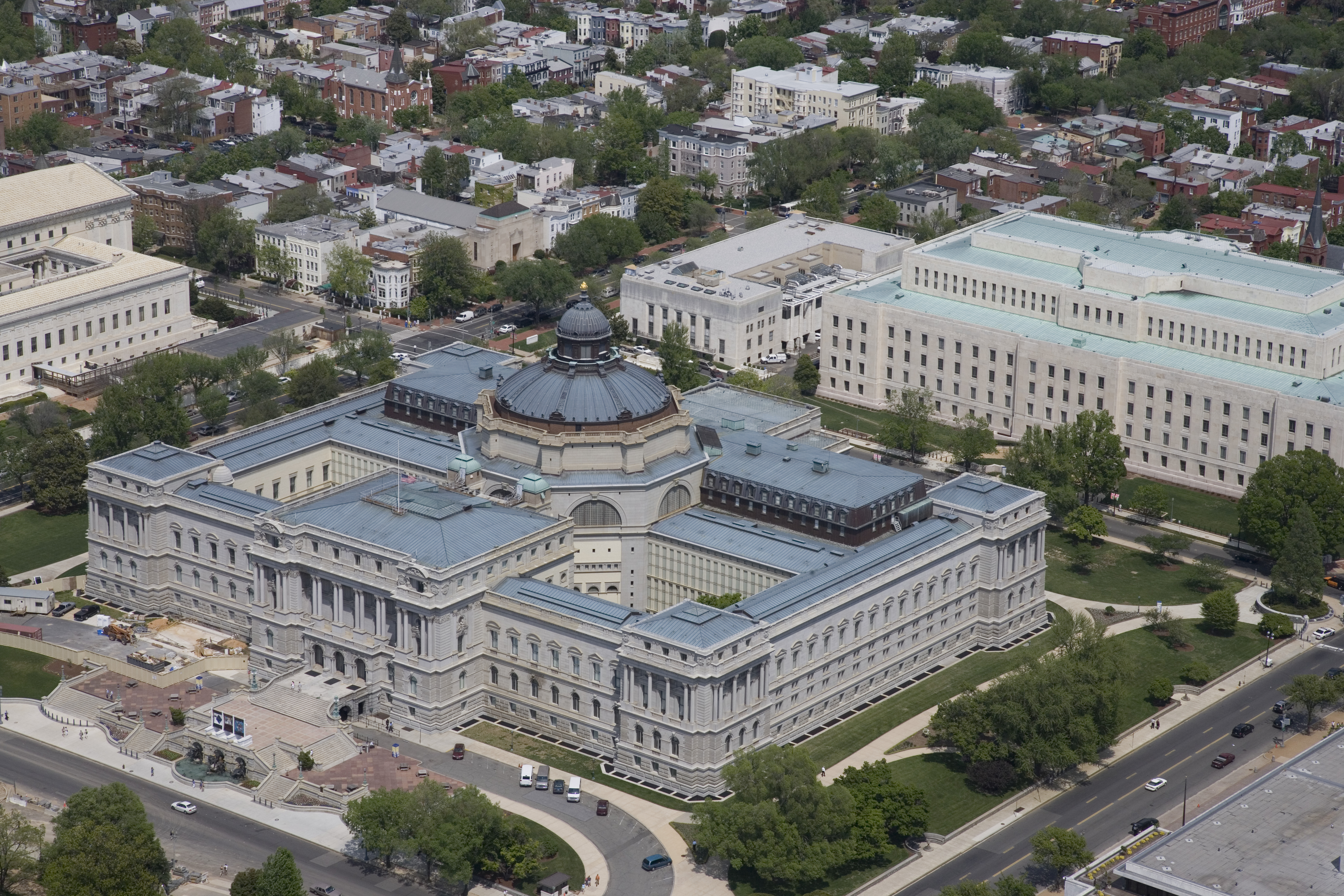
Library of Congress Jefferson Building

The Library of Congress (LOC) was established by an act of Congress in 1800. It is primarily housed in three buildings on Capitol Hill, but also includes several other sites: the National Library Service for the Blind and Physically Handicapped in Washington, D.C.; the National Audio-Visual Conservation Center in Culpeper, Virginia; a large book storage facility located in Fort Meade, Maryland; and multiple overseas offices. The Library had mostly law books when it was burnt by British forces in 1814 during the War of 1812.

The library's collections were restored and expanded when Congress authorized the purchase of Thomas Jefferson's private library. One of the library's missions is to serve Congress and its staff as well as the American public. It is the largest library in the world, with nearly 150 million items including books, films, maps, photographs, music, manuscripts, graphics, and materials in 470 languages.

===== Congressional Research Service =====
The Congressional Research Service

The Congressional Research Service (CRS), part of the Library of Congress, provides detailed, up-to-date and non-partisan research for senators, representatives, and their staff to help them carry out their official duties. It provides ideas for legislation, helps members analyze a bill, facilitates public hearings, makes reports, consults on matters such as parliamentary procedure, and helps the two chambers resolve disagreements. It has been called the "House's think tank" and has a staff of about 900 employees.

==== Congressional Budget Office ====
The Congressional Budget Office (CBO) is a federal agency which provides economic data to Congress.

It was created as an independent non-partisan agency by the Congressional Budget and Impoundment Control Act of 1974. It helps Congress estimate revenue inflows from taxes and helps the budgeting process. It makes projections about such matters as the national debt as well as likely costs of legislation. It prepares an annual Economic and Budget Outlook with a mid-year update and writes An Analysis of the President's Budgetary Proposals for the Senate's Appropriations Committee. The speaker of the House and the Senate's president pro tempore jointly appoint the CBO director for a four-year term.

==== Government Accountability Office ====
The Government Accountability Office (GAO), is a federal agency within the legislative branch that provides auditing, evaluative, and investigative services for the United States Congress in an independent and nonpartisan capacity.

The GAO is the supreme audit institution of the federal government of the United States. It identifies its core "mission values" as: accountability, integrity, and reliability. It is also known as the "congressional watchdog".

==== Architect of the Capitol ====
The Architect of the Capitol (AOC) is a federal agency within the legislative branch that is responsible for the maintenance, operation, development, construction, building preservation, and property management of the United States Capitol Complex and is accountable directly to the United States Congress and the Supreme Court of the United States.

==== Lobbying ====
Lobbyists represent diverse interests and often seek to influence congressional decisions to reflect their clients' needs. Lobby groups and their members sometimes write legislation and whip bills. In 2007, there were approximately 17,000 federal lobbyists in Washington, D.C. They explain to legislators the goals of their organizations. Some lobbyists represent non-profit organizations and work pro bono for issues in which they are personally interested.

=== Partisanship versus bipartisanship ===
Congress has alternated between periods of constructive cooperation and compromise between parties, known as bipartisanship, and periods of deep political polarization and fierce infighting, known as partisanship. The period after the Civil War was marked by partisanship, as is the case today. It is generally easier for committees to reach accord on issues when compromise is possible. Some political scientists speculate that a prolonged period marked by narrow majorities in both chambers of Congress has intensified partisanship in the last few decades, but that an alternation of control of Congress between Democrats and Republicans may lead to greater flexibility in policies, as well as pragmatism and civility within the institution.

== Procedures ==
=== Sessions ===
A term of Congress is divided into two "sessions", one for each year; Congress has occasionally been called into an extra or special session. A new session commences on January 3 each year unless Congress decides differently. The Constitution requires Congress to meet at least once each year and forbids either house from meeting outside the Capitol without the consent of the other house.

=== Joint sessions ===
Joint sessions of the United States Congress occur on special occasions that require a concurrent resolution from House and Senate. These sessions include counting electoral votes after a presidential election and the president's State of the Union address. The constitutionally mandated report, normally given as an annual speech, is modeled on Britain's Speech from the Throne, was written by most presidents after Jefferson but personally delivered as a spoken oration beginning with Wilson in 1913. Joint Sessions and Joint Meetings are traditionally presided over by the speaker of the House, except when counting presidential electoral votes when the vice president (acting as the president of the Senate) presides.

=== Bills and resolutions ===
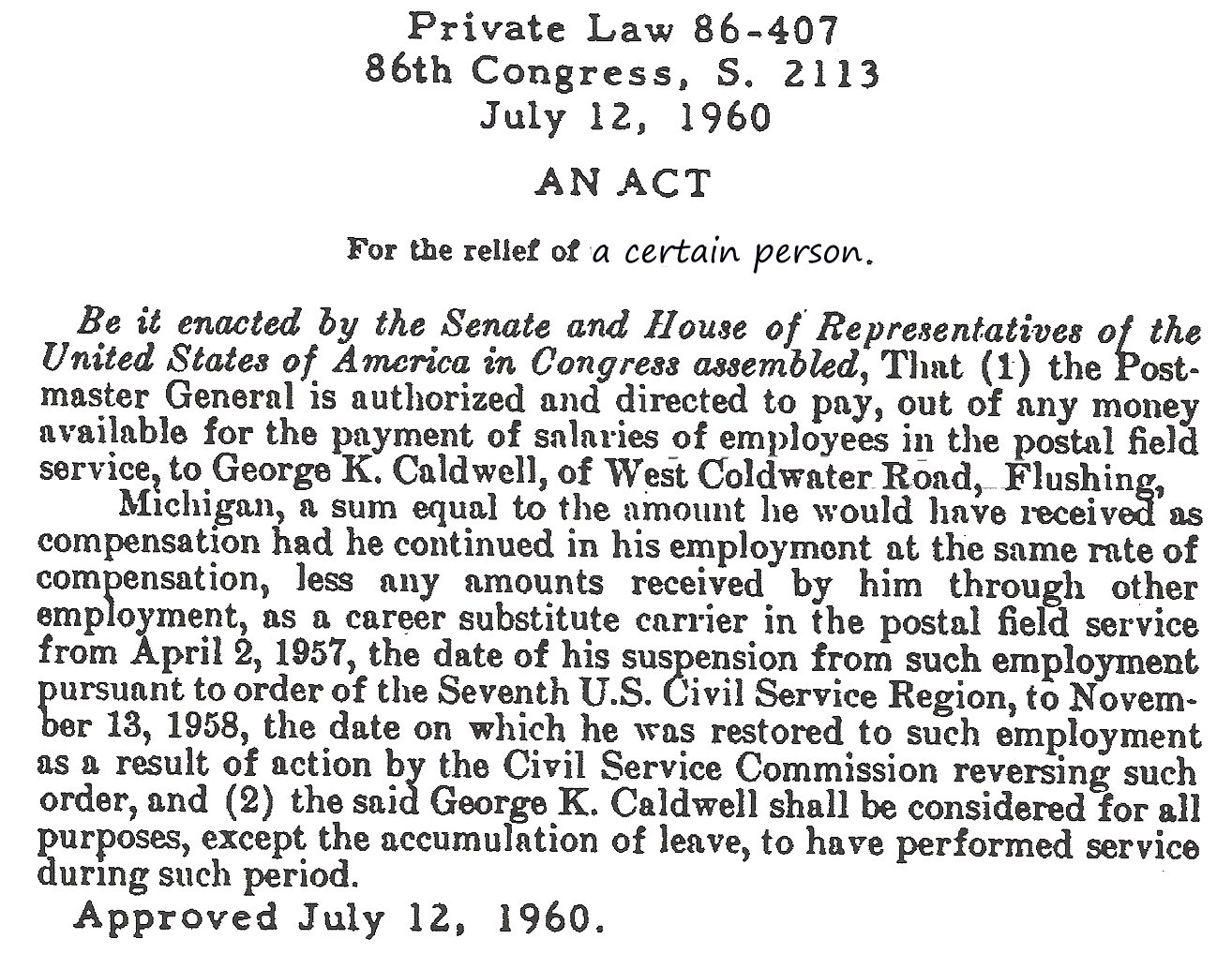
An act of Congress from 1960

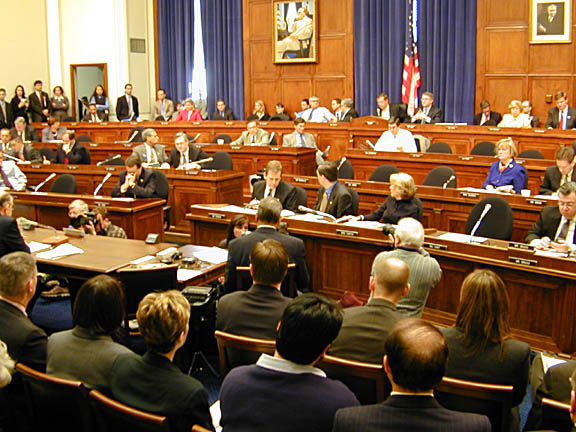
The U.S. Committee on Financial Services with committee members sitting in the tiers of raised chairs and those testifying and audience members sitting below

Ideas for legislation can come from members, lobbyists, state legislatures, constituents, legislative counsel, or executive agencies. Anyone can write a bill, but only members of Congress may introduce bills. Most bills are not written by Congress members, but originate from the Executive branch; interest groups often draft bills as well. The usual next step is for the proposal to be passed to a committee for review. A proposal is usually in one of these forms:

- Bills are laws in the making. A House-originated bill begins with the letters "H.R." for "House of Representatives", followed by a number kept as it progresses.
- Joint resolutions. There is little difference between a bill and a joint resolution since both are treated similarly; a joint resolution originating from the House, for example, begins "H.J.Res." followed by its number.
- Concurrent Resolutions affect only the House and Senate and accordingly are not presented to the president. In the House, they begin with "H.Con.Res."
- Simple resolutions concern only the House or only the Senate and begin with "H.Res." or "S.Res."

Representatives introduce a bill while the House is in session by placing it in the hopper on the Clerk's desk. It is assigned a number and referred to a committee which studies each bill intensely at this stage. Drafting statutes requires "great skill, knowledge, and experience" and sometimes take a year or more. Sometimes lobbyists write legislation and submit it to a member for introduction. Joint resolutions are the normal way to propose a constitutional amendment or declare war. On the other hand, concurrent resolutions (passed by both houses) and simple resolutions (passed by only one house) do not have the force of law but express the opinion of Congress or regulate procedure. Bills may be introduced by any member of either house. The Constitution states: "All Bills for raising Revenue shall originate in the House of Representatives." While the Senate cannot originate revenue and appropriation bills, it has the power to amend or reject them. Congress has sought ways to establish appropriate spending levels.

Each chamber determines its own internal rules of operation unless specified in the Constitution or prescribed by law. In the House, a Rules Committee guides legislation; in the Senate, a Standing Rules committee is in charge. Each branch has its own traditions; for example, the Senate relies heavily on the practice of getting "unanimous consent" for noncontroversial matters. House and Senate rules can be complex, sometimes requiring a hundred specific steps before a bill can become a law. Members sometimes turn to outside experts to learn about proper congressional procedures.

Each bill goes through several stages in each house including consideration by a committee and advice from the Government Accountability Office. Most legislation is considered by standing committees which have jurisdiction over a particular subject such as Agriculture or Appropriations. The House has twenty standing committees; the Senate has sixteen. Standing committees meet at least once each month. Almost all standing committee meetings for transacting business must be open to the public unless the committee votes, publicly, to close the meeting. A committee might call for public hearings on important bills. Each committee is led by a chair who belongs to the majority party and a ranking member of the minority party. Witnesses and experts can present their case for or against a bill. Then, a bill may go to what is called a mark-up session, where committee members debate the bill's merits and may offer amendments or revisions. Committees may also amend the bill, but the full house holds the power to accept or reject committee amendments. After debate, the committee votes whether it wishes to report the measure to the full house. If a bill is tabled then it is rejected. If amendments are extensive, sometimes a new bill with amendments built in will be submitted as a so-called clean bill with a new number. Both houses have procedures under which committees can be bypassed or overruled but they are rarely used. Generally, members who have been in Congress longer have greater seniority and therefore greater power.

A bill which reaches the floor of the full house can be simple or complex and begins with an enacting formula such as "Be it enacted by the Senate and House of Representatives of the United States of America in Congress assembled ..." Consideration of a bill requires, itself, a rule which is a simple resolution specifying the particulars of debate – time limits, possibility of further amendments, and such. Each side has equal time and members can yield to other members who wish to speak. Sometimes opponents seek to recommit a bill which means to change part of it. Generally, discussion requires a quorum, usually half of the total number of representatives, before discussion can begin, although there are exceptions. The house may debate and amend the bill; the precise procedures used by the House and Senate differ. A final vote on the bill follows.

Once a bill is approved by one house, it is sent to the other which may pass, reject, or amend it. For the bill to become law, both houses must agree to identical versions of the bill. If the second house amends the bill, then the differences between the two versions must be reconciled in a conference committee, an ad hoc committee that includes senators and representatives sometimes by using a reconciliation process to limit budget bills. Both houses use a budget enforcement mechanism informally known as pay-as-you-go or paygo which discourages members from considering acts that increase budget deficits. If both houses agree to the version reported by the conference committee, the bill passes, otherwise it fails.

The Constitution specifies that a majority of members (a quorum) be present before doing business in each house. The rules of each house assume that a quorum is present unless a quorum call demonstrates the contrary and debate often continues despite the lack of a majority.

Voting within Congress can take many forms, including systems using lights and bells and electronic voting. Both houses use voice voting to decide most matters in which members shout "aye" or "no" and the presiding officer announces the result. The Constitution requires a recorded vote if demanded by one-fifth of the members present or when voting to override a presidential veto. If the voice vote is unclear or if the matter is controversial, a recorded vote usually happens. The Senate uses roll-call voting, in which a clerk calls out the names of all the senators, each senator stating "aye" or "no" when their name is announced. In the Senate, the Vice President may cast the tie-breaking vote if present when the senators are equally divided.

The House reserves roll-call votes for the most formal matters, as a roll call of all 435 representatives takes quite some time; normally, members vote by using an electronic device. In the case of a tie, the motion in question fails. Most votes in the House are done electronically, allowing members to vote yea or nay or present or open. Members insert a voting ID card and can change their votes during the last five minutes if they choose; in addition, paper ballots are used occasionally (yea indicated by green and nay by red). One member cannot cast a proxy vote for another. Congressional votes are recorded on an online database.

After passage by both houses, a bill is enrolled and sent to the president for approval. The president may sign it making it law or veto it, perhaps returning it to Congress with the president's objections. A vetoed bill can still become law if each house of Congress votes to override the veto with a two-thirds majority. Finally, the president may do nothing neither signing nor vetoing the bill and then the bill becomes law automatically after ten days (not counting Sundays) according to the Constitution. But if Congress is adjourned during this period, presidents may veto legislation passed at the end of a congressional session simply by ignoring it; the maneuver is known as a pocket veto, and cannot be overridden by the adjourned Congress.

== Public interaction ==
=== Advantage of incumbency ===
==== Citizens and representatives ====
Senators face reelection every six years, and representatives every two. Reelections encourage candidates to focus their publicity efforts at their home states or districts. Running for reelection can be a grueling process of distant travel and fund-raising which distracts senators and representatives from paying attention to governing, according to some critics. Although others respond that the process is necessary to keep members of Congress in touch with voters.

Incumbent members of Congress running for reelection have strong advantages over challengers. They raise more money because donors fund incumbents over challengers, perceiving the former as more likely to win, and donations are vital for winning elections. One critic compared election to Congress to receiving life tenure at a university. Another advantage for representatives is the practice of gerrymandering. After each ten-year census, states are allocated representatives based on population, and officials in power can choose how to draw the congressional district boundaries to support candidates from their party. As a result, reelection rates of members of Congress hover around 90 percent, causing some critics to call them a privileged class. Academics such as Princeton's Stephen Macedo have proposed solutions to fix gerrymandering in the U.S. Senators and representatives enjoy free mailing privileges, called franking privileges; while these are not intended for electioneering, this rule is often skirted by borderline election-related mailings during campaigns.

==== Expensive campaigns ====
In 1971, the cost of running for Congress in Utah was $70,000 but costs have climbed. The biggest expense is television advertisements. Today's races cost more than a million dollars for a House seat, and six million or more for a Senate seat. Since fundraising is vital, "members of Congress are forced to spend ever-increasing hours raising money for their re-election", according to the Fair Elections Now coalition.

The Supreme Court has treated campaign contributions as a free speech issue. Some see money as a good influence in politics since it "enables candidates to communicate with voters". Few members retire from Congress without complaining about how much it costs to campaign for reelection. Critics contend that members of Congress are more likely to attend to the needs of heavy campaign contributors than to ordinary citizens.

Elections are influenced by many variables. Some political scientists speculate there is a coattail effect (when a popular president or party position has the effect of reelecting incumbents who win by "riding on the president's coattails"), although there is some evidence that the coattail effect is irregular and possibly declining since the 1950s. Some districts are so heavily Democratic or Republican that they are called a safe seat; any candidate winning the primary will almost always be elected, and these candidates do not need to spend money on advertising. But some races can be competitive when there is no incumbent. If a seat becomes vacant in an open district, then both parties may spend heavily on advertising in these races; in California in 1992, only four of twenty races for House seats were considered highly competitive.

==== Television and negative advertising ====
Since members of Congress must advertise heavily on television, this usually involves negative advertising, which smears an opponent's character without focusing on the issues. Negative advertising is seen as effective because "the messages tend to stick." These advertisements sour the public on the political process in general as most members of Congress seek to avoid blame. One wrong decision or one damaging television image can mean defeat at the next election, which leads to a culture of risk avoidance, a need to make policy decisions behind closed doors, and concentrating publicity efforts in the members' home districts.

=== Perceptions ===
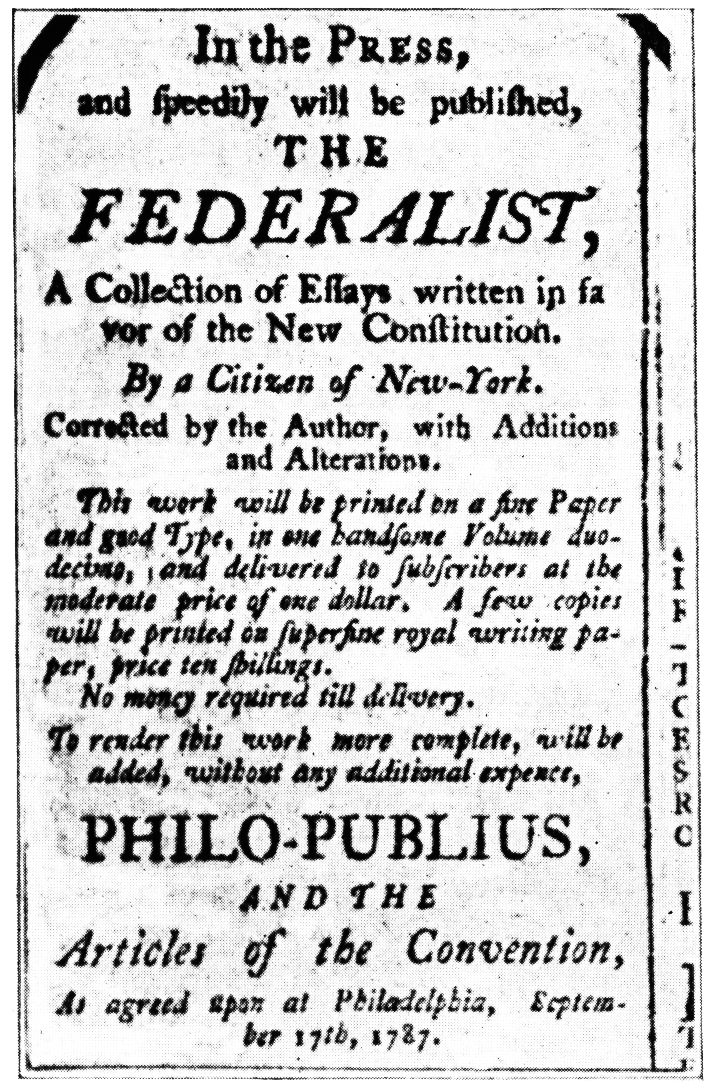
The Federalist Papers, which argued in favor of a strong connection between citizens and their representatives

Prominent Founding Fathers, writing in The Federalist Papers, felt that elections were essential to liberty, that a bond between the people and the representatives was particularly essential, and that "frequent elections are unquestionably the only policy by which this dependence and sympathy can be effectually secured." In 2009, few Americans were familiar with leaders of Congress. The percentage of Americans eligible to vote who did, in fact, vote was 63% in 1960, but has been falling since, although there was a slight upward trend in the 2008 election.

Public opinion polls asking people if they approve of the job Congress is doing have, in the last few decades, hovered around 25% with some variation. Scholar Julian Zeliger suggested that the "size, messiness, virtues, and vices that make Congress so interesting also create enormous barriers to our understanding the institution ... Unlike the presidency, Congress is difficult to conceptualize." Other scholars suggest that despite the criticism, "Congress is a remarkably resilient institution ... its place in the political process is not threatened ... it is rich in resources" and that most members behave ethically. They contend that "Congress is easy to dislike and often difficult to defend" and this perception is exacerbated because many challengers running for Congress run against Congress, which is an "old form of American politics" that further undermines Congress's reputation with the public:

The rough-and-tumble world of legislating is not orderly and civil, human frailties too often taint its membership, and legislative outcomes are often frustrating and ineffective ... Still, we are not exaggerating when we say that Congress is essential to American democracy. We would not have survived as a nation without a Congress that represented the diverse interests of our society, conducted a public debate on the major issues, found compromises to resolve conflicts peacefully, and limited the power of our executive, military, and judicial institutions ... The popularity of Congress ebbs and flows with the public's confidence in government generally ... the legislative process is easy to dislike – it often generates political posturing and grandstanding, it necessarily involves compromise, and it often leaves broken promises in its trail. Also, members of Congress often appear self-serving as they pursue their political careers and represent interests and reflect values that are controversial. Scandals, even when they involve a single member, add to the public's frustration with Congress and have contributed to the institution's low ratings in opinion polls.

— Smith, Roberts & Wielen

Since 2006, Congress has dropped ten points in the Gallup confidence poll with only nine percent having "a great deal" or "quite a lot" of confidence in their legislators. Since 2011, Gallup poll has reported Congress's approval rating among Americans at 10% or below three times. Public opinion of Congress plummeted further to 5% in October 2013 after parts of the U.S. government deemed 'nonessential government' shut down. The most common political issues voters expected the United States Congress to work on were cost of living, economy, taxes, government ethics, immigration and health care according to a 2026 poll.

=== Smaller states and bigger states ===
When the Constitution was ratified in 1787, the ratio of the populations of large states to small states was roughly twelve to one. The Connecticut Compromise gave every state, large and small, an equal vote in the Senate. Since each state has two senators, residents of smaller states have more clout in the Senate than residents of larger states. But since 1787, the population disparity between large and small states has grown; in 2006, for example, California had seventy times the population of Wyoming.

Critics, such as constitutional scholar Sanford Levinson, have suggested that the population disparity works against residents of large states and causes a steady redistribution of resources from "large states to small states". Others argue that the Connecticut Compromise was deliberately intended by the Founding Fathers to construct the Senate so that each state had equal footing not based on population, and contend that the result works well on balance.

=== Members and constituents ===
A major role for members of Congress is providing services to constituents. Constituents request assistance with problems. Providing services helps members of Congress win votes and elections and can make a difference in close races. Congressional staff can help citizens navigate government bureaucracies. One academic described the complex intertwined relation between lawmakers and constituents as home style.

=== Motivation ===
One way to categorize lawmakers, according to former University of Rochester political science professor Richard Fenno, is by their general motivation:

1. Reelection: These are lawmakers who "never met a voter they didn't like" and provide excellent constituent services.
2. Good public policy: Legislators who "burnish a reputation for policy expertise and leadership".
3. Power in the chamber: Lawmakers who spend serious time along the "rail of the House floor or in the Senate cloakroom ministering to the needs of their colleagues". Famous legislator Henry Clay in the mid-19th century was described as an "issue entrepreneur" who looked for issues to serve his ambitions.

== Privileges ==
=== Outside income and gifts ===
Representative Jim Cooper of Tennessee told Harvard professor Lawrence Lessig that a chief problem with Congress was that members focused on their future careers as lobbyists after serving – that Congress was a "Farm League for K Street". Family members of active legislators have also been hired by lobbying firms, which while not allowed to lobby their family member, has drawn criticism as a conflict of interest.

Members of congress have been accused of insider trading, such as in the 2020 congressional insider trading scandal, where members of Congress or their family members have traded on stocks related to work on their committees. One 2011 study concluded that portfolios of members of Congress outperformed both the market and hedge funds, which the authors suggested as evidence of insider trading. Proposed solutions include putting stocks in blind trusts to prevent future insider trading.

Some members of Congress have gone on lavish trips paid for by outside groups, sometimes bringing family members, which are often legal even if in an ethical gray area.

In 2026, proposals to prohibit members of Congress from trading individual stocks received renewed attention. In July, the House of Representatives passed the Stop Insider Trading Act, which would prohibit member of Congress from purchasing individual stocks while in office. The issue gained further prominence in September during the Republican Party's midterm convention in Dallas, where Representative Anna Paulina Luna advocated restrictions on congressional stock trading.

=== Pay ===
Some critics complain congressional pay is high compared with a median American income. Others have countered that congressional pay is consistent with other branches of government. Another criticism is that members of Congress are insulated from the health care market due to their coverage. Others have criticized the wealth of members of Congress. In January 2014, it was reported that for the first time over half of the members of Congress were millionaires. Congress has been criticized for trying to conceal pay raises by slipping them into a large bill at the last minute.

Members elected since 1984 are covered by the Federal Employees Retirement System (FERS). Like other federal employees, congressional retirement is funded through taxes and participants' contributions. Members of Congress under FERS contribute 1.3% of their salary into the FERS retirement plan and pay 6.2% of their salary in Social Security taxes. And like federal employees, members contribute one-third of the cost of health insurance with the government covering the other two-thirds. The size of a congressional pension depends on the years of service and the average of the highest three years of their salary. By law, the starting amount of a member's retirement annuity may not exceed 80% of their final salary. In 2018, the average annual pension for retired senators and representatives under the Civil Service Retirement System (CSRS) was $75,528, while those who retired under FERS, or in combination with CSRS, was $41,208.

Members of Congress make fact-finding missions to learn about other countries and stay informed, but these outings can cause controversy if the trip is deemed excessive or unconnected with the task of governing. For example, The Wall Street Journal reported in 2009 that lawmaker trips abroad at taxpayer expense had included spas, $300-per-night extra unused rooms, and shopping excursions. Some lawmakers responded that "traveling with spouses compensates for being away from them a lot in Washington" and justify the trips as a way to meet officials in other nations.

By the Twenty-seventh Amendment, changes to congressional pay may not take effect before the next election to the House of Representatives. In Boehner v. Anderson, the United States Court of Appeals for the District of Columbia Circuit ruled that the amendment does not affect cost-of-living adjustments.

==== Pensions ====
Members of Congress first elected in 1984 or later are generally covered by the Federal Employees Retirement System (FERS), which includes Social Security, a basic retirement annuity, and the Thrift Savings Plan. Members become vested in a pension after five years of service, and under FERS may receive a pension at age 62 with at least five years of federal service, at age 50 with at least 20 years of service, or at any age with at least 25 years of service. The amount of the pension is based on the member's length of service, accrual rate, and the average of the three consecutive years of highest pay, often called the "high-3" salary. Members first covered by FERS after 2013 generally contribute 4.4 percent of pay toward FERS, in addition to Social Security payroll taxes. As of October 1, 2022, 619 retired members of Congress received federal pensions based at least partly on congressional service; the average annual annuity was $84,504 for retirees under the older Civil Service Retirement System and $45,276 for retirees with service under FERS.

=== Postage ===
The franking privilege allows members of Congress to send official mail to constituents at government expense. Though they are not permitted to send election materials, borderline material is often sent, especially in the run-up to an election by those in close races. Some academics consider free mailings as giving incumbents a big advantage over challengers.

=== Protection ===
Members of Congress enjoy parliamentary privilege, including freedom from arrest in all cases except for treason, felony, and breach of the peace, and freedom of speech in debate. This constitutionally derived immunity applies to members during sessions and when traveling to and from sessions. The term "arrest" has been interpreted broadly, and includes any detention or delay in the course of law enforcement, including court summons and subpoenas. The rules of the House strictly guard this privilege; a member may not waive the privilege on their own but must seek the permission of the whole house to do so. Senate rules are less strict and permit individual senators to waive the privilege as they choose.

The Constitution guarantees absolute freedom of debate in both houses, providing in the Speech or Debate Clause of the Constitution that "for any Speech or Debate in either House, they shall not be questioned in any other Place." Accordingly, a member of Congress may not be sued in court for slander because of remarks made in either house, although each house has its own rules restricting offensive speeches, and may punish members who transgress.

Obstructing the work of Congress is a crime under federal law and is known as contempt of Congress. Each member has the power to cite people for contempt but can only issue a contempt citation – the judicial system pursues the matter like a normal criminal case. If convicted in court of contempt of Congress, a person may be imprisoned for up to one year.

== See also ==
- Caucuses of the United States Congress
- Congressional archives – Records documenting the history and activities of the United States Congress
- Congressional Baseball Game – Annual baseball game played by members of the United States Congress
- Divided government in the United States – Divided control of the US government between political parties
- Elections in the United States § Congressional elections
- List of current United States representatives
- List of current United States senators
- List of United States Congresses
- Oath of office § United States
- Radio and Television Correspondents' Association
- United States congressional hearing

== Citations ==
Preceded by Congress of the Confederation	Legislature of the United States; March 4, 1789 – present	Succeeded by Current
