= William Woodward (artist, born 1935) =

American painter (1935–2023)

William Woodward (March 11, 1935 – June 14, 2023) was an American painter and muralist from Washington, D.C. He is known for his mural commissions throughout the United States and a number of his pieces are in the permanent collections of major museums.

== Biography ==
=== Early life and education ===
Woodward is a third-generation native of Washington, D.C. Woodward’s father and grandfather were both artists. His father, Thomas Edwin Woodward, was a commercial artist. His paternal grandfather, Edwin Ashlee Woodward, was a sign painter of large billboards, restaurant murals, and circus posters and signage.

In 1952, Woodward was admitted to American University on the Mary Graydon academic scholarship. He earned his BA and MA degrees from American University, where he studied with Sarah Baker, Ben Summerford, and Robert Gates. He also studied at The Catholic University of America with the art historian John Shapley. He was subsequently awarded a two-year fellowship from The Leopold Schepp Foundation (1957–59) for independent study abroad. He used this fellowship to study in Florence, Italy, at the Accademia di Belli Arti. While studying in Florence, he became a frequent guest of the art historian and art connoisseur Bernard Berenson, at Villa I Tatti.

=== Teaching ===
In Washington DC, Woodward taught drawing at the Sheridan School, American University, Madeira School, Saint Albans School, and the Corcoran School of Art. At present, he is Professor Emeritus of Fine Art at George Washington University, where he was program director for the Master of Fine Arts (MFA) degree for 37 years (1969-2006). During his tenure at GWU he directed the overseas summer study program in Brittany, France for many years. He mentored several generations of artists in the materials and techniques of the Old Masters. Many of his former students became noted contemporary artists.

== Style and technique ==
Woodward’s work synthesizes the techniques of the Old Masters with contemporary subject matter. He works primarily in oils, in alla prima painting, on hand stretched canvas. In his work, he often employs the multiple glaze technique favored by the Old Masters. He has presented lectures and demonstrations as a guest expert at the National Gallery of Art in Washington, DC, re-creating the painting techniques of Old Masters, such as Titian and Peter Paul Rubens.

In an article by Rafael Squirru in Americas Magazine, Woodward explained: “Without commitment to any dogma, I explore the familiar, seeking to uncover a significant surprise that it still contains – a poignance of mood, an unexpected aspect of color, a novel juxtaposition of shapes. I strive to record the fleeting circumstances or context which engages me.”

== Critical reaction ==
In Americas Magazine, Rafael Squirru, former Cultural Director of the Organization of American States, called Woodward a “virtuoso... a painter’s painter”.

Benjamin Forgey, art and architectural critic of The Washington Post, observed, “[Woodward’s] paintings are alive with knowledge, translated from eye to hand…. It’s really wonderful what he can do. His ability to draw, his feeling for the figure in space, his understanding of dramatic situations – his skills have kept developing in the 25 years that I’ve observed him.”

In a Washington Post review of his solo exhibition, Back to Brittany at the Fendrick Gallery in Washington, DC, Mary McCoy praised Woodward as “...one of Washington’s most fluent realist painters.”

Mark Jenkins for The Washington Post recently noted, “William Woodward is not literally an Old Master... But the local painter has the range and technique of one.”

Jill Wechsler for American Artist wrote, “Woodward has contributed to restoring faith in the continued vitality of traditional painting, helping to secure its niche in the modern art world.”

Woodward died on June 14, 2023, at the age of 88.

== Works and paintings in public places ==
Many of his major commissions are murals and paintings in public spaces, including:

- 2009: Jefferson at Monticello, Thomas Jefferson Visitors Center, Monticello, Charlottesville, VA
- 2008: Dolley Madison Rescuing the Portrait of George Washington, Montpelier Visitors Center, Madison, VA
- 2007: A View of the Soldiers Home in Lincoln’s Time, Lincoln Cottage Visitor Center, Washington, DC
- 2002: A Loudoun County Story, Thomas Balch Library, Leesburg, VA
- 1996: The Great Odyssey of Medicine, Cyrus Vesuna Conference Center, Inova Fairfax Hospital, Fairfax, VA
- 1989: The Greatest Show on Earth, Circus Museum and the Tibbals Learning Center at the John and Mable Ringling Museum of Art, Sarasota, Florida
- 1985: Today’s Army Proud and Ready/Leadership, Department of Defense, Washington, DC
- 1983: Space Shuttle Launch, Orbital Flight STS-7, NASA, Washington, DC
- 1982: The Memorial Day Parade, City Hall, Rockville, MD
- 1976: Portrait of John Paul Jones, National Park Service, Harpers Ferry, WV

=== Permanent collections ===
Woodward's works are also part of the permanent collections of the Speed Art Museum, Lexington, Kentucky; Washington County Museum of Fine Arts, Hagerstown, Maryland; Ogunquit Museum of Fine Arts, Ogunquit, Maine; National Air and Space Museum, Washington, DC; American University Museum at the Katzen Arts Center, Washington, D; Huntington Museum of Art, Pasadena, California; Ringling Museum of Art, Sarasota, Florida; Corcoran Museum of Art, Washington, DC and Virginia Museum of Fine Arts, Richmond, VA

=== Other works ===
One of Woodward’s most notable series is his depiction of The Seven Deadly Sins: A Comedy. In 2017, the series was exhibited at the American University Museum at the Katzen Arts Center in Washington, DC, and attracted record breaking crowds. It has been lauded as the most attended solo show ever held at the museum.

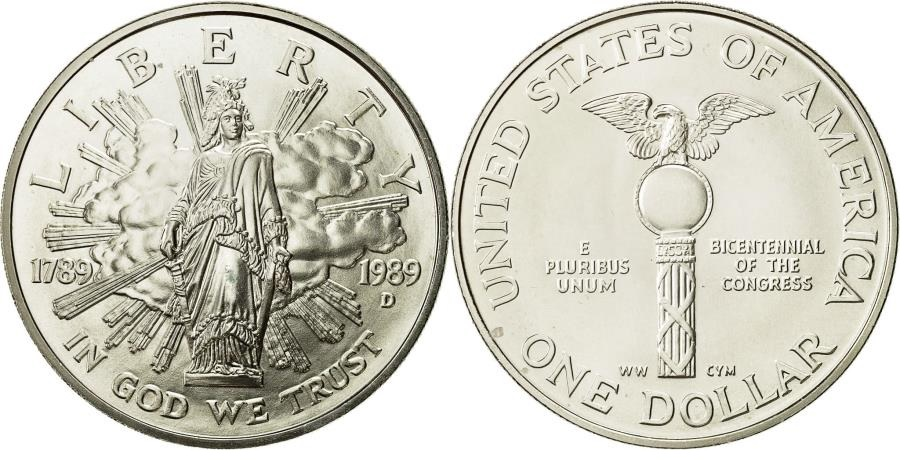
1989 Congress Bicentennial Silver Dollar designed by William Woodward.

Woodward is the only artist ever to design both the obverse and reverse of a United States coin as a winner of the invitational design competition. The silver dollar minted in 1989 by the U.S Treasury commemorates the 200th anniversary of the U.S. Congress. The obverse features a depiction of the Statue of Freedom, which crowns the Capitol dome. The reverse of the coin is an illustration of the mace of the United States House of Representatives.
