= Ohlone College =

Community college in Fremont, California, US

- Type: Public community college
- Established: 1965
- Parent institution: California Community Colleges
- President: Charles S. Sasaki
- Faculty: 465 (PT and FT)
- Administrative staff: 235
- Students: 11,579
- Location: Fremont, California, U.S. 37°31′49.88″N 121°54′52.05″W
- Campus: Suburban 2 campuses (Fremont and Newark)
- Colors: Green, yellow, white
- Nickname: Renegades
- Sporting affiliations: CCCAA – Coast Conference
- Website: www.ohlone.edu

Ohlone College (Ohlone or OC; /oʊˈloʊni/) is a public community college.

The Ohlone Community College District serves the cities of Fremont, Newark, and parts of Union City in the Alameda County, southeast of San Francisco Bay. It includes two campuses and an e-campus. The main campus is in Fremont, with a second satellite campus in Newark.

A member of the California Community College System, Ohlone offers 61 associate degree programs leading to university transfer or careers and over 100 vocational certificate programs that provide job skill training.

== History ==
In 1965, Ohlone College was established as a California Community College following voter approval.

In 1966, the first board of trustees was elected, which then hired the founding president, Stephen Epler, in June 1966.

On June 18, 1967, the college was formally named Ohlone College in honor of the Ohlone people, whose unceded lands include much of the surrounding area.

In fall 1967, the college opened at the Serra Center, a temporary site on Washington Boulevard.

In 1972, after a municipal bond for US$10 million (equivalent to $77 million in 2025) was issued, the college began construction of the new Ohlone College main campus on Mission Boulevard in Fremont.

Ernest J. Kump designed the original nine buildings that make up the academic village. Buildings added later to the campus include the performing arts center, the technology center, the child development center and the student services center.

In 1972, the Ohlone College Center for Deaf Studies and Special Services was established when the college opened its doors to 30 deaf and hard of hearing students.

In 2008, a second campus, the Ohlone College Newark Center for Health Sciences and Technology, opened in Newark.

In 2020, Eric Bishop was selected to be the school's seventh president.

In 2023, Charles S. Sasaki was appointed as the eighth and current president.

== Sports ==
Ohlone fields teams in seven varsity sports (six men's, seven women's) including tennis, swimming, baseball, basketball, soccer, and water polo. It is a member of the CCCAA (California Community College Athletics Association) and of the Coast Conference.

== Academics ==
Ohlone offers associate degrees in the Arts and Sciences (AA and AS) equivalent to completing the two year undergraduate coursework in many subjects. Ohlone also offers job training programs that can be completed in less than the two-year cycle required and 60 units for a degree.

=== Center for Deaf Studies ===
The Center for Deaf Studies has up to 200 deaf and hard of hearing students in a single year.

=== Biotechnology high school outreach programs ===
Learning Alliance for Bioscience (LAB) Program is a National Science Foundation funded program that places high school students from underrepresented populations on an academic pathway to prepare for college degrees in biotechnology.

=== Broadcasting Department ===
The broadcasting department provides two stations for student use:

- Film & television: ONTV 28, broadcast on Comcast and streamed online.
- Radio: KOHL 89.3 FM.

==== ONTV 28 ====
The Broadcasting Dept: Film & Television offers classes in beginning and advanced short film and video production, television news, documentary production, video editing, writing for media, and shooting digital video.

ONTV produces a live newscast on Wednesday nights at 8:30 pm during the spring and fall semesters.

==== KOHL 89.3 FM ====
KOHL radio has been the host of notable individuals, such as civil rights activist Bobby Seale, as well as actress Rita Moreno.

==== Broadcasting Department alumni ====
Among dozens of producers, reporters, directors, and filmmakers working in film, television, and the Internet, notable graduates of the program have included:

- Tiffany Liou (WFAA reporter)
- Azemith Smith (KTVU reporter)
- Rebecca Strom (KRON-TV)
- Erin Tomasello (casting director)
- Tommy Tran (Anchor for CBS Sports)
- Betty Yu (KPIX-TV reporter)

=== Registered Nursing Department ===
Ohlone College offers an Associate of Science Degree in Nursing accredited by the National League for Nursing Accrediting Commission and the California Board of Registered Nurses. Students who graduate from this program are eligible to sit for the NCLEX-RN which leads to licensure as a registered nurse (RN).

=== Physical Therapist Assistant (PTA) Department ===
Ohlone College's Physical Therapist Assistant (PTA) program is a two calendar year course of study leading to an Associate of Science Degree and eligibility to take the National PTA licensing examination.

Ohlone College's PTA program is accredited by the Commission on Accreditation in Physical Therapy Education of the American Physical Therapy Association.

=== Respiratory Therapist (RT) Department ===
The Respiratory Therapist is a licensed healthcare professional in cardio-pulmonary evaluation, diagnosis, and treatment.

Upon completion of Respiratory Therapist program, graduates are eligible to sit for the California State License Examination for Respiratory Care Practitioner (RCP). Once the RCP Credential has been attained graduates are eligible to sit for the Advanced Level Practitioner Examinations (RRT) of the National Board for Respiratory Care.

== Notable alumni ==
- Ring Ayuel (born 1988), South Sudanese basketball player
- Glenn Dishman (born 1970), baseball pitcher and pitching coach
- Brian Dunning (born 1965), author
- Dina Ruiz Eastwood (born 1965, television personality, Salinas-Monterey news anchor)
- Larry Johannessen (1947–2009), author
- Kenney Mencher (born 1965), painter
- Anjuli Papineau, soccer player and soul singer
- Gary Plummer (born 1960), American footballer

== Notable faculty ==
- Lev Kirshner (born 1969), soccer player and coach
