= US Capitol Bicentennial silver dollar =

United States commemorative coin

US Capitol Bicentennial dollar
- United States
- Value: 1 U.S. Dollar
- Mass: 26.730 g
- Diameter: 38.1 mm (1.500 in)
- Thickness: 2.58 mm
- Edge: Reeded
- Composition: 90% Ag / 10% Cu
- Years of minting: 1994
- Mintage: 68,332 Uncirculated 279,579 Proof
- Mint marks: D, Uncirculated stirkes S, Proof strikes

Obverse
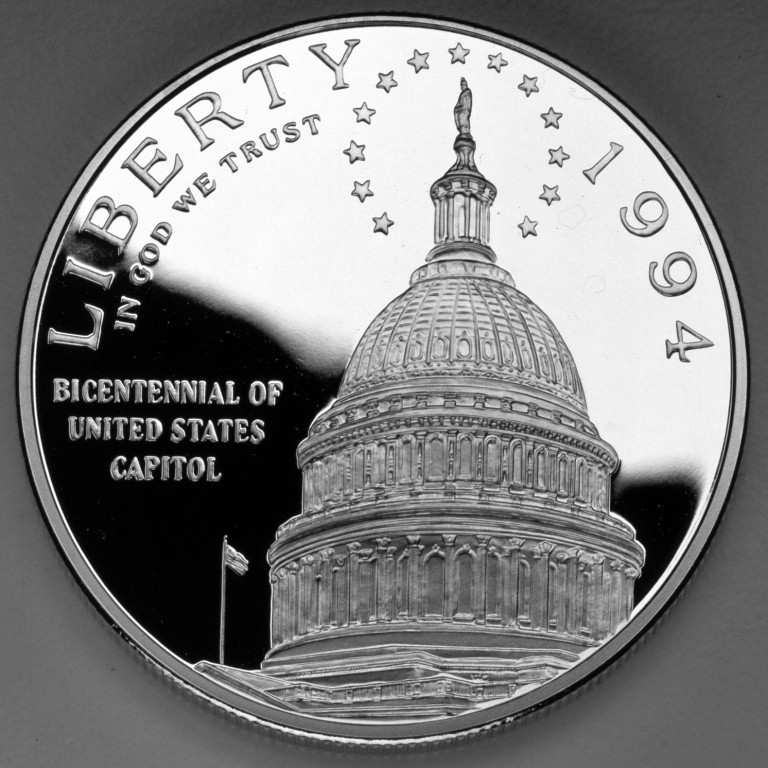
- Design: Dome of the US Capitol
- Designer: William C. Cousins

Reverse
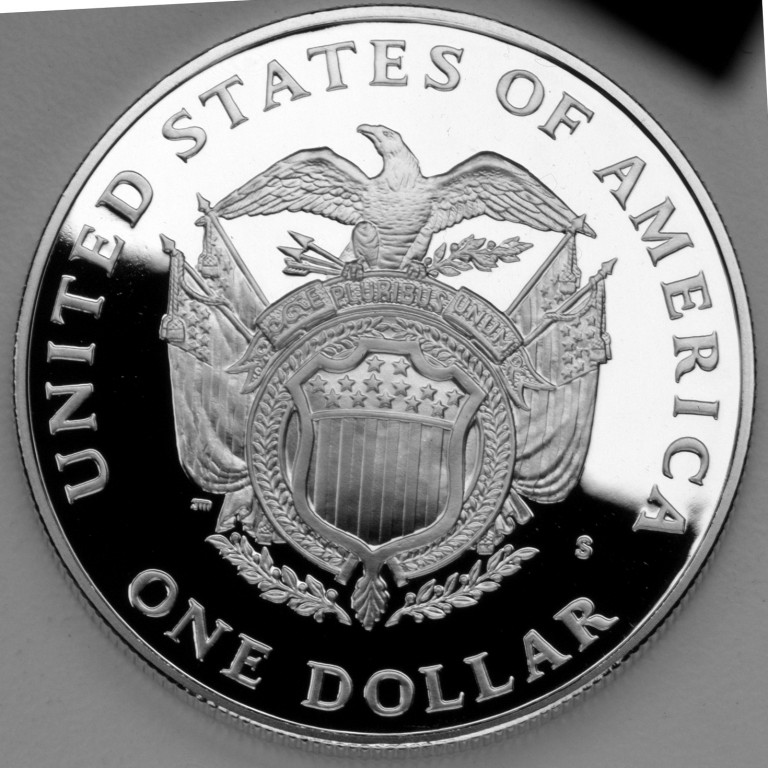
- Design: Shield with eagle and American flags
- Designer: John Mercanti

The US Capitol Bicentennial silver dollar is a commemorative coin issued by the United States Mint in 1994. The coin commemorates the bicentennial of the United States Capitol in Washington, DC.

== See also ==
- List of United States commemorative coins and medals (1990s)
- United States Congress Bicentennial commemorative coins
- United States commemorative coins
