= Poh Wah Hillock =

Singaporean-Australian mathematician

Poh Wah Hillock is a Singaporean and Australian mathematician and mathematics educator, and an associate professor of mathematics at the University of Queensland in Australia. She was named as the 2022 Australian University Teacher of the Year.

Hillock is originally from Singapore, and first came to Australia as a teenager through a Colombo Plan teaching scholarship. She became a high school mathematics teacher in Singapore before returning to Australia for a Ph.D. in mathematics at the University of Adelaide. Her dissertation, in the geometry of numbers, was supervised by Paul R. Scott. She became a lecturer in mathematics at the Nanyang Technological University in Singapore, left academia to raise a family, and then in 2012 took her current position at the University of Queensland.

As well as her recognition as Australian University Teacher of the Year, Hillock was recognized in 2021 by the University of Queensland, given an award for teaching excellence "for transforming first year mathematics courses at UQ by building an extensive support network and collaborative learning environments for students". She is also an amateur baker and has incorporated her baking into her mathematics lessons.
