= The Artist's Magazine =

American monthly magazine

- Frequency: Monthly
- First issue: 1983; 42 years ago
- Company: Macanta Investments, LLC
- Country: USA
- Based in: Cincinnati, Ohio
- ISSN: 0741-3351

The Artist's Magazine is a monthly magazine for artists formerly published by F+W Media in Cincinnati, Ohio. The magazine was founded in 1983 and claims a circulation of 60,000. The founding company was Fletcher Art Services. F&W Publications acquired the magazine in September 1986. In 2019 the company stopped its operations and its publications were sold. Macanta Investments, LLC, acquired The Artist's Magazine.

It focuses on painting technique, special effects, marketing, and business topics. It published the book, The Pencil Box: A Treasury of Time-Tested Drawing Techniques and Advice (2006).

In July 2012, The Artist's Magazine's publisher bought out Interweave, the publisher of another art magazine titled American Artist. After their final issue December 2012 (75 year special), further publications from its writers were incorporated into The Artist's Magazine.

== See also ==
- Jerry Weiss
- Kenney Mencher
