= George Hillocks Jr. =

American scientific academic (1934–2014)

- Born: June 15, 1934; Cleveland, Ohio
- Died: November 12, 2014 (aged 80)
- Education: College of Wooster (1956), Case Western Reserve University (1958, 1970)
- Known for: Analytical techniques for teaching expository writing in middle and secondary schools, critiquing methods of writing assessment.
- Scientific career
- Fields: English Education
- Workplaces: University of Chicago

George Hillocks Jr. (June 15, 1934 - November 12, 2014) was an emeritus professor in the Department of Education, with a joint appointment in the Department of English Language and Literature at the University of Chicago. He received in 2011 the James R. Squire Award of the National Council of Teachers of English for having "a transforming influence and [making] a lasting intellectual contribution to the profession." He also received many other major awards (see below). His teaching career included the preparation of English teachers in the Master of Arts in Teaching program, and the mentoring of Ph.D. students in the doctoral program, at the University of Chicago. After retiring from the University he continued to present seminars and workshops for writing teachers across the US. His primary research interests centered on the teaching of writing, literature, and language in middle and high school English classes, and on large-scale writing assessment. When not teaching and writing, he was an accomplished bagpipe player, performing frequently for Chicago audiences and in international competitions.

George Hillocks as a youth

== Education ==
He received his B.A. in English, College of Wooster, Wooster, Ohio, 1956, M.A. in English, Case Western Reserve University, 1958, Diploma in English Studies, University of Edinburgh, Scotland, 1959. He attended Harvard University, Graduate School of Education, summer, 1961. Ph.D. in English, Case Western Reserve University, Cleveland, Ohio, 1970--Dissertation: The Synthesis of Art and Ethic in Tom Jones

== Teaching career ==
Hillocks began his teaching career teaching secondary English in the Euclid, Ohio public schools from 1956-1965. He then held various positions at Bowling Green State University from 1967 to 1971. He moved to the University of Chicago in 1971 as assistant professor and remained there for the remainder of his career, rising through the ranks to Full Professor in 1985 until his retirement in 2003.

== Publications ==
Hillocks's publications mostly focus on what happens in the classroom. His publications include the first NCTE Theory into Practice book, Observing and Writing. Using this model, his students have written seven additional books in the TIP/TRIP series. His review of research from 1963–1983, Research on Written Composition remains one of the most frequently referenced publications in composition studies, having been cited over 600 times. His publication Teaching Writing as Reflective Practice won the Russell Award for Distinguished Research presented by NCTE. The Testing Trap provides a critique of large-scale writing assessments. More recently, Narrative Writing: Learning a New Model for Teaching won NCTE's Richard Meade award for excellence in writing in the field of English Education.

=== Books ===
- Hillocks, G. (2011). Teaching argument writing, grades 6-12: Supporting claims with relevant evidence and clear reasoning. Portsmouth, NH: Heinemann.
- Hillocks, G. (2007). Narrative writing: Learning a new model for teaching. Portsmouth, NH: Heinemann.
- Hillocks, G. (2002). The testing trap: How state writing assessments control learning. New York: Teachers College Press.
- Hillocks, G. (1999). Ways of thinking, ways of teaching. New York: Teachers College Press.
- Hillocks, G. (1995). Teaching writing as reflective practice. New York: Teachers College Press.
- Hillocks, G. (1986). Research on written composition: New directions for teaching. Urbana, IL: National Conference on Research in English and Educational Resources Information Center.
- Hillocks, G. (1972). Alternatives in English: A critical analysis of elective programs. Urbana, IN: ERIC Clearinghouse on Reading and Communication Skills and National Council of Teachers of English.
- Hillocks, G., McCabe, B., & McCampbell, J. F. (1970). The dynamics of English instruction. New York: Random House, 1971.

=== Monographs ===
- Hillocks, G., Smith, W. L., et al. (1986). Class size and English in the secondary school. Urbana: NCTE and ERIC.
- Observing_and_Writing.pdf Hillocks, G. (1975). Observing and writing. Urbana: ERIC and NCTE.
- Hillocks, G. (1971). An evaluation of Project Apex: A nongraded phase-elective English program. Trenton (Michigan) Public Schools, [Study conducted and published under the auspices of USOE].
- Hillocks, G., Kinnick, B. J., et al. (1966). The school literary magazine. Champaign: National Council of Teachers of English.
- Hillocks, G. (1965).Cooperative research project no. D-067: A comprehensive program in English for the 7th, 8th, and 9th grades. United States Office of Education.

=== Edited collections ===
- Hillocks, G. (1982). (Ed.). The English curriculum under fire: What are the real basics? Urbana, Il: National Council of Teachers of English.
- Hillocks, G. (Ed.) ( 1974.). Cutlass and rapier: A collection of satire. Reprinted as The last laugh. New York: Scholastic Book Services.
- Hillocks, G. & Shugrue, M. (Eds.). (1965). Classroom practices in teaching English, Champaign: National Council of Teachers of English.
- Hillocks, G. & McCampbell, J.F. (Eds.). (1965). Talks on the teaching of English. Euclid, Ohio: Project English Demonstration Center. Distributed by NCTE.
- Hillocks, G. & McCampbell, J. F. (Eds.). (1964). An introduction to a curriculum. Euclid, Ohio: Project English Demonstration Center.
- Hillocks, G.& Shugrue, M. (Eds.)(1964). Patterns and models for teaching English. Champaign: National Council of Teachers of English.

== Honors and awards ==
=== Fellowships ===
- Fellow, American Educational Research Association 2009
- Elected to National Academy of Education, 2000
- Fellow, Center for Advanced Study in the Behavioral Sciences, Palo Alto, CA, 2000–2001
- Fellow, National Conference on Research in English (now NCRLL), 1987

=== Research and service awards ===
- The Richard Meade Award for distinguished research in English education for the book Narrative Writing: Learning a New Model for Teaching November 2008.
- Distinguished Service Award from the National Council of Teachers of English 2004
- Outstanding Academic Work Award from Choice for The Testing Trap, 2003
- Thomas R. Watson Visiting Distinguished Professor of Rhetoric and Composition, Spring Semester, 2000, University of Louisville
- David H. Russell Award from NCTE for Distinguished Research in the Teaching of English for the book Teaching Writing as Reflective Practice 1997
- National Education Association Pacemaker Award for Euclid Central English Curriculum, 1965

=== Biographical listings ===
- Listed in Who’s Who in the World, 2001 edition
- Listed in Who’s Who in America, 2002- 2009 editions
- Listed in Who’s Who in American Education, 2007 edition

=== Leadership of national organizations ===
- President, National Conference on Research on Language and Literacy, 2000–2001
- Vice-president of National Conference on Research in Language and Literacy, 1999–2000
- Chair, NCTE Standing Committee on Research
