= Standard Form 50 =

US federal government employment document

Standard Form 50 (SF 50), officially titled Notification of Personnel Action, is a United States government form used to process various personnel actions for government employees.

The form is very important for government employees: any errors in the form can affect eligibility for certain benefits (such as when an employee can retire and with what level of annuity).

== The Form ==
The first four blocks on the SF 50 list the employee's name, Social Security Number, date of birth, and the effective date of the personnel action. The effective date (Block 4) is important for annuity purposes (as an employee nears retirement) as it is the beginning date used to calculate how long an employee has held a particular pay rate for "high-3" purposes under either of the retirement systems (FERS or CSRS).

Blocks 5 and 6 ("First Action" and "Second Action") are subdivided into sub-blocks. Sub-blocks A and B are used to note the action being taken, while sub-blocks C/D (and E/F, where applicable) give the legal authority for the change being made.

Blocks 7 through 22 are shown in a "from/to" format, whereby Blocks 7 through 14 list the employee's status before the SF 50 action, while Blocks 15 through 22 list the employee's status after the SF 50 action. These blocks list the employee's position title (7/15), pay plan (8/16), occupational code (9/17), grade (10/18), step (11/19), total salary (12/20), pay basis (13/21), and name and location of position's organization (14/22). Blocks 12/20 are further subdivided into sub-blocks A (basic pay), B (locality adjustment), C (adjusted basic pay, total of A and B), and D (other pay). This section is most frequently used to denote general pay increases, promotions or within-grade increases, changes in duty station, or any monetary awards.

Blocks 23 through 33 list various employee data fields, which are important for various benefits and rights. These blocks list veteran's preference (23), tenure (24), "agency use" (25), veteran's preference for RIF (26; RIF stands for "reduction in force", or a layoff in private sector terms), the level of FEGLI insurance enrollment (27), whether the employee is a re-hired annuitant (28), pay rate determinant (29), the retirement plan (30; whether under CSRS or FERS and also whether under FICA or not), service computation date (31), work schedule (32), and if part time the number of hours per pay period (33). The Service Computation Date (Block 31) is not necessarily the date on which an employee began his/her civil service career: if an employee left civil service and then later returned, the date is adjusted to a date which would reflect no break in service.

Blocks 34 through 39 list employee data fields pertaining to the position as of the effective date of the SF 50. These blocks list the type of position occupied (34), whether the position is or is not exempt from FLSA (35), the appropriation code (36), bargaining unit status (37), and the code and location of the employee's duty station (38 and 39).

Finally blocks 40 through 50 list other miscellaneous information. Blocks 40 through 44 list various agency data fields, the remaining blocks list any remarks (45; for example a within-grade increase may state "work performance is at an acceptable level"), the employee's department, code and personnel office ID (46 through 48), and the approval date and signature of the SF 50 (49 and 50).

== Standard Form 52 ==
Every SF 50 is generated by first creating an SF 52 ("Request for Personnel Action"). The SF 52 mirrors exactly the SF 50 for Blocks 1 through 44 (under Part B) and Block 45 (Part F).
