= MSCI EAFE =

Index measuring stock market performance

The MSCI EAFE Index is a stock market index that is designed to measure the equity market performance of developed markets outside of the U.S. & Canada. It is maintained by MSCI Inc., a provider of investment decision support tools; the EAFE acronym stands for Europe, Australasia and Far East.

The index is market-capitalization weighted (meaning that the weight of securities is based on their respective market capitalizations). It first ranks each stock in the investable universe from largest to smallest by market capitalization. The largest 70% will compose the MSCI EAFE Large Cap (new index), the largest 85% will compose the MSCI EAFE Standard, and the largest 99% will compose the MSCI Investable Market index (IMI). The 71st to 85th percentiles represent the MSCI EAFE Mid Cap, and the 85th to 99th percentiles represent the MSCI EAFE Small Cap.

The index includes a selection of stocks from 21 developed markets, but excludes those from the U.S. and Canada. The index has been calculated since 31 December 1969, making it the oldest truly international stock index. It is probably the most common benchmark for foreign stock funds in the U.S.

== Countries ==
The MSCI EAFE index includes stocks of around 700 companies from these countries:

Europe	Australasia	Far East	Middle East
Austria	Australia	Hong Kong	Israel
Belgium	New Zealand	Japan	
Denmark		Singapore	
Finland			
France			
Germany			
Ireland			
Italy			
Netherlands			
Norway			
Portugal			
Spain			
Sweden			
Switzerland			
United Kingdom			

These are the same countries and regions as for MSCI World except without the U.S. and Canada. Africa and South America are not represented.

Greece was part of this index from May 2001, when MSCI upgraded Greece from emerging market to developed market, to November 2013 when MSCI downgraded Greece from developed to emerging market.

Israel joined this index in May 2010 when MSCI upgraded Israel from emerging market to developed market.

== Investing ==
Many managers of North American international stock funds use the EAFE as a performance benchmark. For example, Thrift Savings Plan's international fund (I Fund) tracks the net version of this index.

The iShares MSCI EAFE Index fund is based on the standard index. EFA is the fourth-largest ETF in the world. They also have iShares MSCI EAFE Small-Cap which has just the small caps. iShares Core MSCI EAFE fund uses the "IMI" version of the index. This fund is similar to EFA but its portfolio represents nearly all of each country's investable market capitalization, while EFA only covers the top 85%, which excludes most small-cap stocks. The TIAA International Equity Index Fund is also based on the EAFE index. Vanguard has the mutual fund Vanguard Developed Markets Index Inv and the Vanguard FTSE Developed Markets ETF; these funds previously used the MSCI EAFE, but now use the FTSE Developed All Cap ex US Index, which is very similar but includes South Korea and Canada, and includes exposure to small-cap stocks.

== See also ==
- MSCI World
