= Structure of the United States Congress =

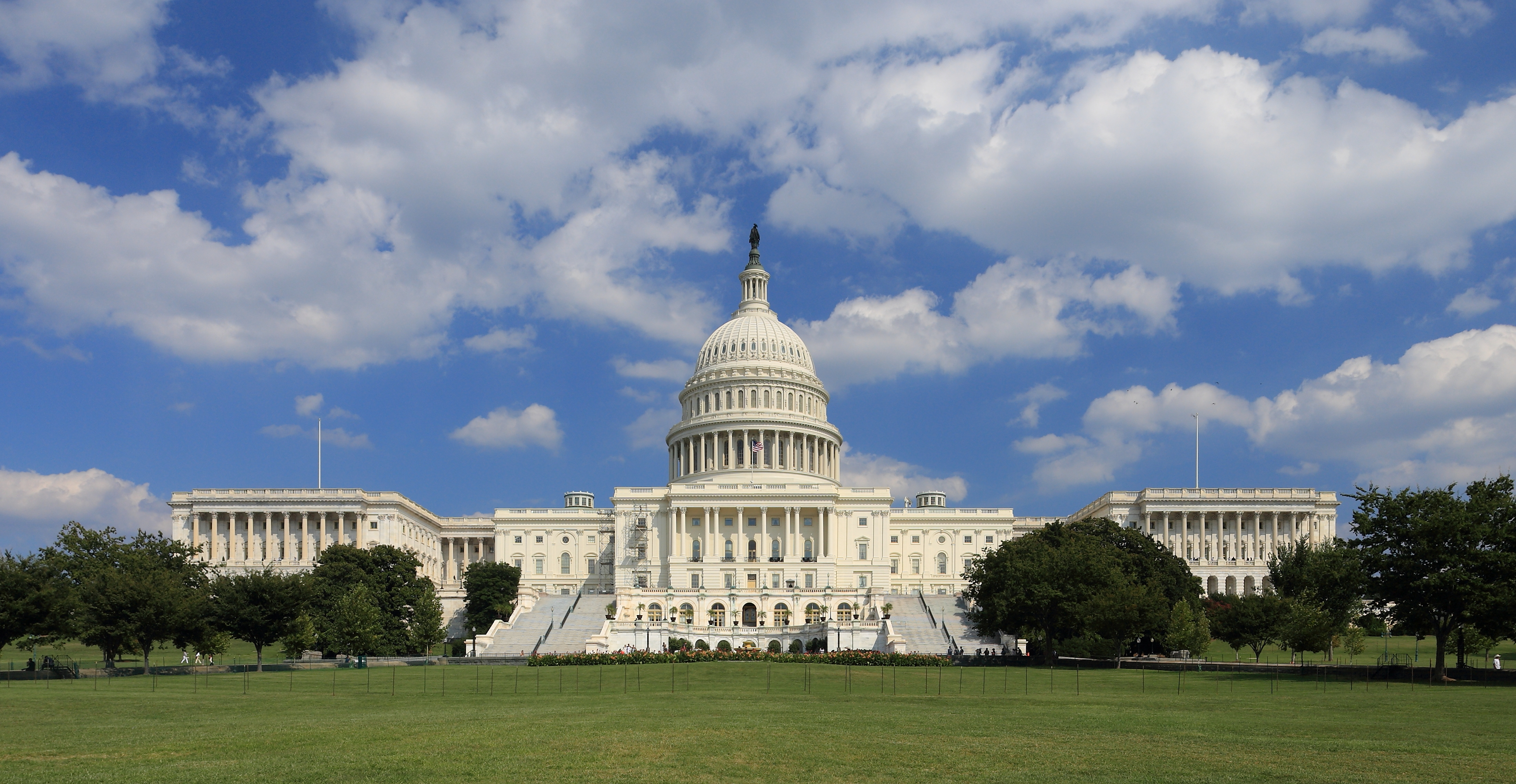
The U.S. Capitol building in Washington, D.C.

The structure of the United States Congress with a separate House and Senate (respectively the lower and upper houses of the bicameral legislature) is complex with numerous committees handling a disparate array of topics presided over by elected officers. Some committees manage other committees. Congresspersons have various privileges to help the presidents serve the national interest and are paid a salary and have pensions. Congress formed a Library of Congress to help assist investigations and developed a Government Accountability Office to help it analyze complex and varied federal expenditures.

== Committees ==
Most congressional legislative work happens in committees. It is neither expected nor possible that a member of Congress be an expert on all matters and subject areas that come before Congress. Congressional committees provide invaluable informational services to Congress by investigating and reporting back in regard to specialized subject matter.

While this investigatory function is indispensable to Congress, procedures such as the House discharge petition process (the process of bringing a bill onto the floor without a committee report or mandatory consent from its leadership) are so difficult to implement that committee jurisdiction over particular subject matter of bills has expanded into semi-autonomous power. Of the 73 discharge petitions submitted to the full House from 1995 through 2007, only one was successful in securing a definitive yea-or-nay vote for a bill on the floor of the House of Representatives. Not without reason have congressional committees been called independent fiefdoms.

In 1931 a reform movement temporarily reduced the number of signatures required on discharge petitions in the U.S. House of Representatives from a constitutional majority of 218 down to 145, i.e. from one-half to one-third of the House membership. This reform was abolished in a 1935 counterattack led by the intra-House oligarchy. Thus the era of the Great Depression marks the last across-the-board change, albeit a short-lived one, in the autonomy of House standing committees. On strategy for an enduring reform in the system of semi-autonomous committees see the citation.

In the course of committee work, members will often develop personal expertise on the matters under the jurisdiction of their respective committee(s). Such expertise, or claims thereof, are invariably cited during disputes over whether the parent body should bow to obdurate committee negatives.

Congress divides its legislative, oversight, and internal administrative tasks among approximately two hundred committees and subcommittees. Within assigned areas, these functional sub-units gather information, compare and evaluate legislative alternatives, identify policy problems and propose solutions, select, determine, and report measures for full chamber consideration, monitor executive branch performance (oversight), and investigate allegations of wrongdoing.

Decision on which areas individual members choose to specialize may be influenced by their constituency and regional issues of importance to them, as well as prior background and experience of the member. Senators will also try to differentiate themselves from the other senator from the same state, so that areas of specialization do not overlap.

The Ways and Means Committee has been seen as a powerful one since it controlled other aspects of House affairs. Here is a list of major House committees:

Major Senate committees

Standing committees

- Agriculture, Nutrition, and Forestry
- Appropriations
- Armed Services
- Banking, Housing, and Urban Affairs
- Budget
- Commerce, Science, and Transportation
- Energy and Natural Resources
- Environment and Public Works
- Finance
- Foreign Relations
- Health, Education, Labor, and Pensions
- Homeland Security and Governmental Affairs
- Judiciary
- Rules and Administration
- Small Business and Entrepreneurship
- Veterans' Affairs

Special, Select, and other committees

- Impeachment Trial Committee (Porteous)
- Indian Affairs
- Select Committee on Ethics
- Select Committee on Intelligence
- Special Committee on Aging

Joint committees

- Joint Committee on Printing
- Joint Committee on Taxation
- Joint Committee on the Library
- Joint Economic Committee

Major House committees

- Committee on Agriculture
- Committee on Appropriations
- Committee on Armed Services
- Committee on the Budget
- Committee on Education and Labor
- Committee on Energy and Commerce
- Committee on Financial Services
- Committee on Foreign Affairs
- Committee on Homeland Security
- Committee on House Administration
- Committee on the Judiciary
- Committee on Natural Resources
- Committee on Oversight and Government Reform
- Committee on Rules
- Committee on Science and Technology
- Committee on Small Business
- Committee on Standards of Official Conduct
- Committee on Transportation and Infrastructure
- Committee on Veterans' Affairs
- Committee on Ways and Means
- Joint Economic Committee
- Joint Congressional Committee on Inaugural Ceremonies
- Joint Committee on Taxation
- House Permanent Select Committee on Intelligence
- House Select Committee on Energy Independence and Global Warming

== Officers ==
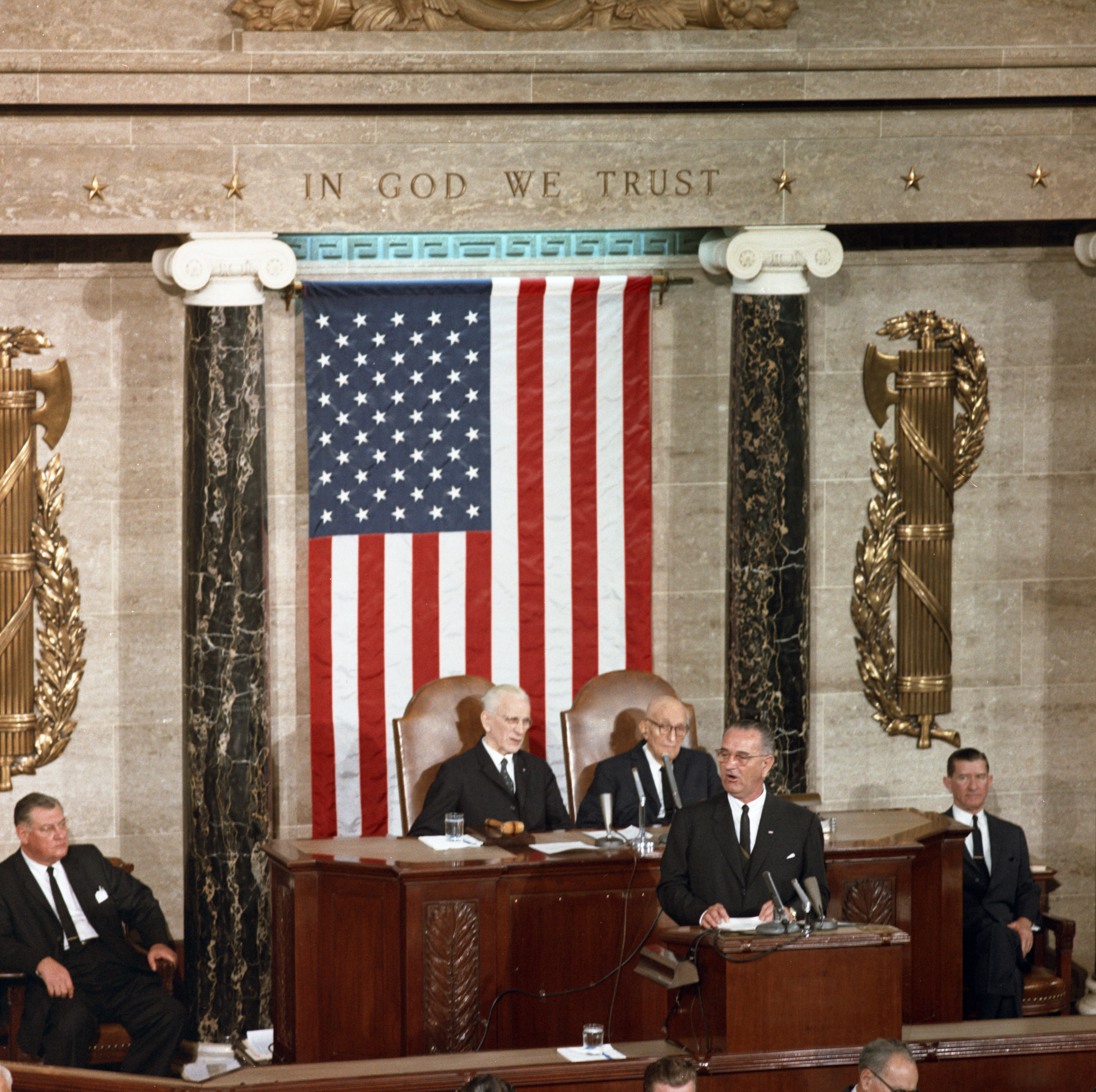
President Lyndon B. Johnson in U.S. Congress in 1963 with Speaker of the House John W. McCormack (left), and Senate President pro tempore Carl T. Hayden (right).

At the beginning of each two-year Congress, the House of Representatives elects a speaker. The speaker does not normally preside over debates, but is, rather, the leader of the majority party in the House. The Vice President of the United States is, ex officio, President of the Senate. The Senate also elects a President pro tempore. For decades the person elected has been the most senior member of the majority party in the Senate, and has held office until they cease to be a senator or a new president pro tempore is elected (usually after a change in party control). Thus, the Senate does not necessarily elect a new president pro tempore at the beginning of a new Congress.

== Privileges ==
Under the Constitution, members of both houses enjoy the privilege of being free from arrest in all cases, except for treason, felony, and breach of the peace. This immunity applies to members during sessions and when traveling to and from sessions. The term "arrest" has been interpreted broadly, and includes any detention or delay in the course of law enforcement, including court summons and subpoenas. The rules of the House strictly guard this privilege; members may not waive the privilege on their own volition, but must seek the permission of the whole house to do so. Senate rules, on the other hand, are less strict, and permit individual senators to waive the privilege as they see fit.

The Constitution also guarantees absolute freedom of debate in both houses, providing, "for any Speech or Debate in either House, they shall not be questioned in any other Place." Hence, a member of Congress may not be sued for slander because of remarks made in either house. However, each house has its own rules restricting offensive speeches, and may punish members who transgress them.

Obstructing the work of Congress is a crime under federal law, and is known as contempt of Congress. Each house of Congress has the power to cite individuals for contempt, but may not impose any punishment. Instead, after a house issues a contempt citation, the judicial system pursues the matter like a normal criminal case. If convicted in court, an individual found guilty of contempt of Congress may be imprisoned for up to one year.

From 1789 to 1815, members of Congress received only a per diem (daily payment) of $6 while in session. Members began receiving an annual salary in 1815, when they were paid $1,500 per year.

As of 2006, rank and file members of Congress received a yearly salary of $165,200. Congressional leaders are paid $183,500 per year. The Speaker of the House of Representatives earns $212,100 per annum. The salary of the President pro tempore for 2006 is $183,500, equal to that of the majority and minority leader of the House and Senate. Privileges include having an office and paid staff. Generally, members who have been in Congress longer have greater seniority and therefore greater power.

Members elected since 1984 are covered by the Federal Employees Retirement System (FERS). Those elected prior to 1984 were covered by the Civil Service Retirement System (CSRS). In 1984 all members were given the option of remaining with CSRS or switching for FERS. As it is for all other federal employees, congressional retirement is funded through taxes and the participants' contributions. Members of Congress under FERS contribute 1.3% of their salary into the FERS retirement plan and pay 6.2% of their salary in Social Security taxes. And like Federal employees, members contribute one-third of the cost of health insurance with the government covering the other two-thirds.

The size of a congressional pension depends on the years of service and the average of the highest three years of salary. By law, the starting amount of a member's retirement annuity may not exceed 80% of the final salary. In 2006, the average annual pension for retired senators and representatives under CSRS was $60,972, while those who retired under FERS, or in combination with CSRS, was $35,952. Members who participated in the congressional pension system are vested after five years of service and who are at least 62 years of age. If members leave Congress before reaching retirement age, they may leave their contributions behind and receive a deferred pension later. The current pension program, effective January 1987, is under the Federal Employees Retirement System (FERS), which covers members and other federal employees whose federal employment began in 1984 or later.

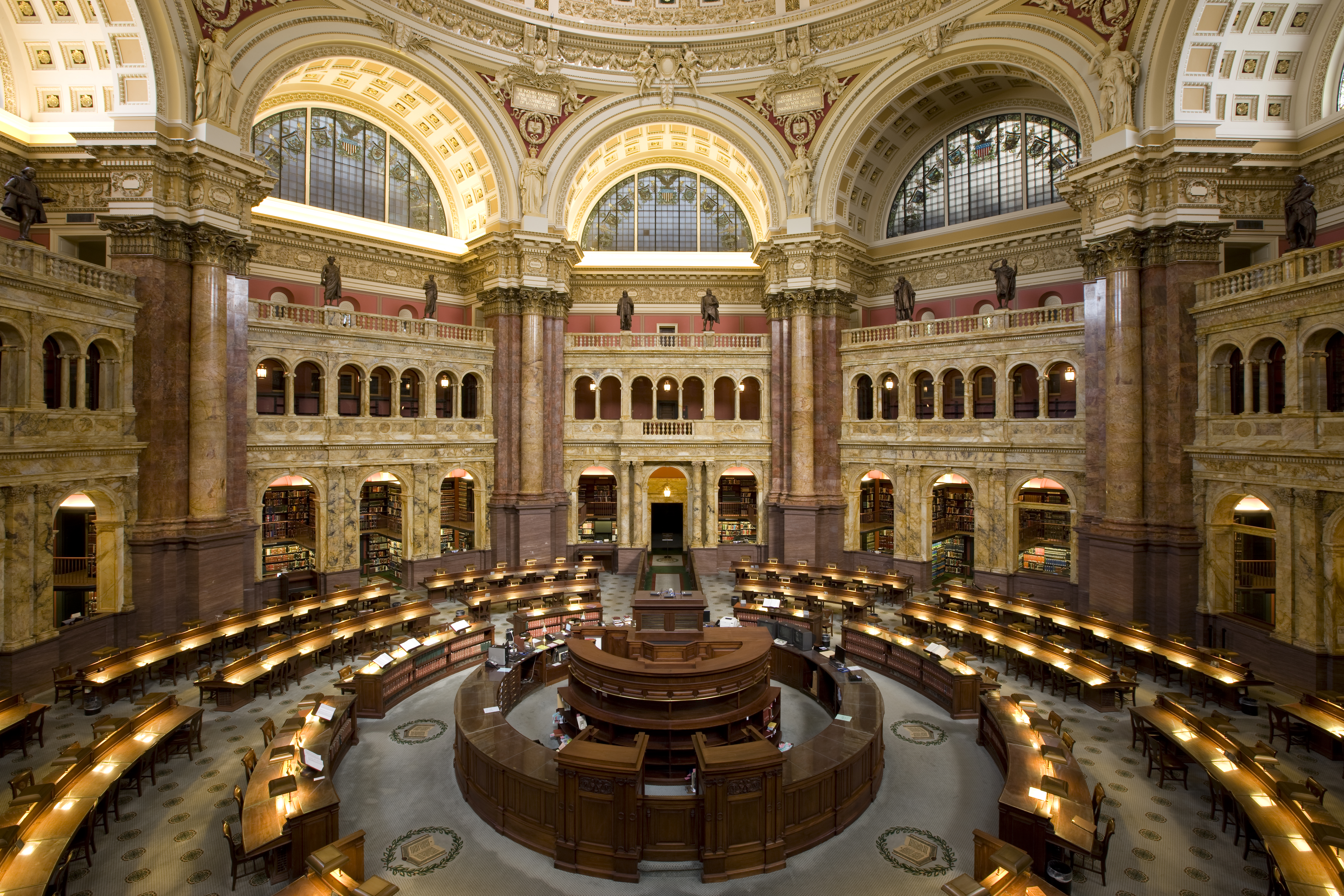
The Library of Congress main reading room in the Thomas Jefferson Building

Another privilege is the use of the Library of Congress which is housed in three buildings. Established in 1800, it consisted mostly of law books which were burned by the British in 1814, but the library collection was restored afterwards with significant gifts from the collection of Thomas Jefferson. One of the Library's missions is to serve the Congress and its staff as well as the American public and is the "largest library in the world" according to one source, with over a hundred million items including books, films, maps, photographs, music, manuscripts, and graphics, and materials in over four hundred and fifty languages. The Congressional Research Service provides detailed, up-to-date and non-partisan research for senators, representatives, and their staff to help them carry out their official duties. The franking privilege allows members of Congress to send official mail to constituents at government expense. Though they are not permitted to send election materials, borderline material is often sent, especially in the run-up to an election by those in close races. Indeed, some academics consider free mailings as giving incumbents a big advantage over challengers.

In 2008, rank and file members of Congress earned $169,300 annually. Some critics complain congressional pay is high compared with a median American income of $45,113 for men and $35,102 for women. Others have countered that congressional pay is consistent with other branches of government. Congress has been criticized for trying to conceal pay raises by slipping them into a large bill at the last minute. Others have criticized the wealth of members of Congress.

Congresspersons are encouraged to journey on fact-finding missions to learn about other countries and gain information. This helps them stay informed. Sometimes, however, these can cause controversy if the trip is deemed excessive or unconnected with the task of governing. For example, the Wall Street Journal reported lawmaker trips abroad at taxpayer expense, which included spas, $300-per-night extra unused rooms, and shopping excursions. One five-day trip by two senators with wives to Germany included excursions along the Rhine and a heavy metal music concert. Another trip had lawmakers staying at Edinburgh's Sheraton Grand Hotel & Spa, which featured "state-of-the-art spa and leisure facilities including a rooftop indoor/outdoor pool" and with wives eating $40-per-person "traditional English cream tea". Lawmakers respond that "traveling with spouses compensates for being away from them a lot in Washington" and justify the trips as a way to meet officials in other nations.

== Government Accountability Office ==
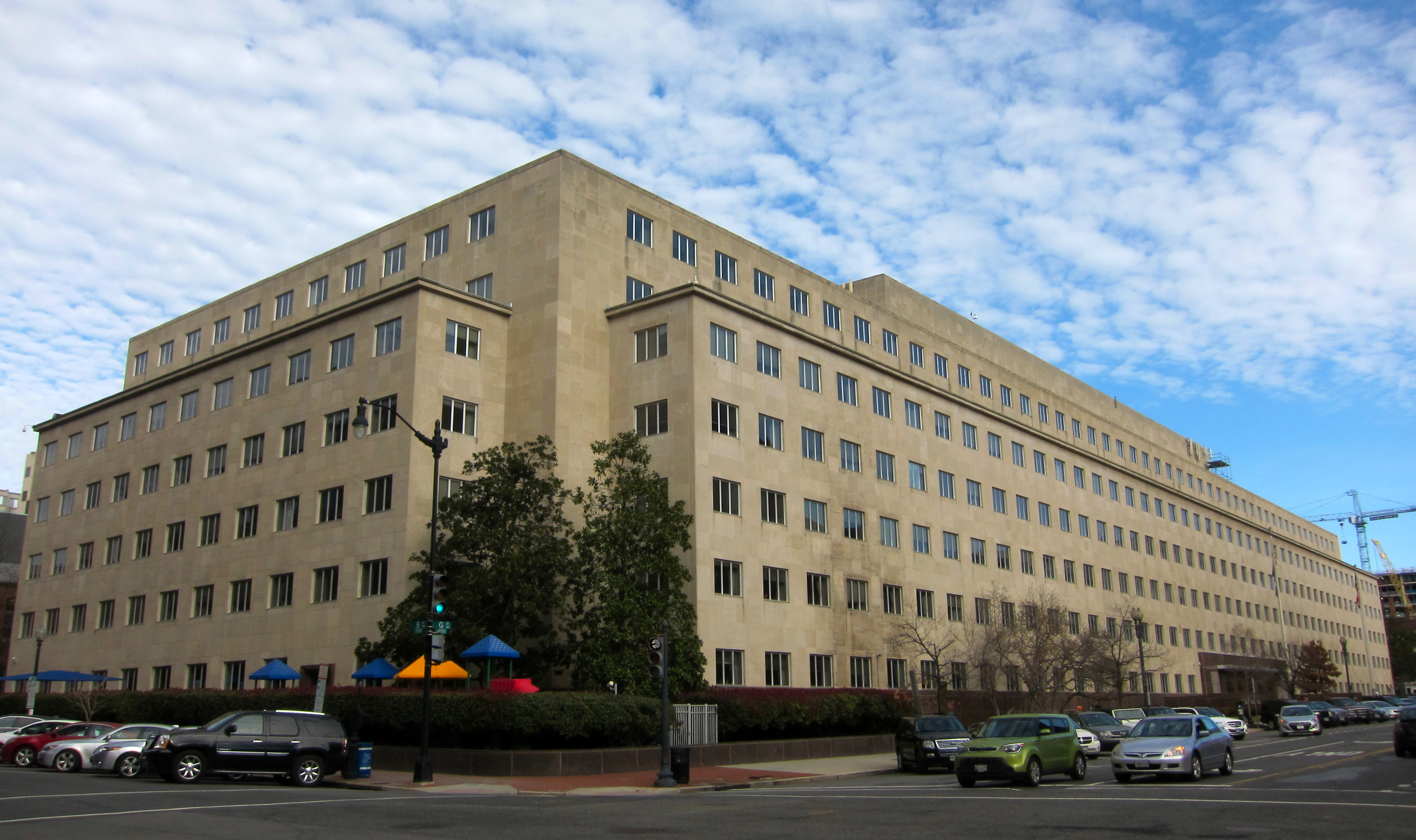
The headquarters of the Government Accountability Office in Washington, D.C.

Congress uses the Government Accountability Office or GAO to help it understand the financial ramifications of various decisions and to perform studies to help guide its legislative activity. It was established as the General Accounting Office by the Budget and Accounting Act of 1921 to investigate the "receipt, disbursement, and application of public funds" and to keep the president and Congress informed about such expenditures. It supports Congress in its efforts to meet its constitutional responsibilities and improve government fiscal performance. The name was changed to Government Accountability Office in 2004. GAO auditors conduct financial audits as well as other performance audits.

== Agencies of the Legislative Branch ==
Some descriptions subsume the following agencies as part of the United States Congress, and some descriptions categorize the following agencies as members of the Legislative Branch that are separate from Congress:

- Architect of the Capitol
- Congressional Budget Office
- Congressional Research Service
- Copyright Office
- Government Accountability Office
- Government Publishing Office
- House Office of Inspector General
- Office of the Clerk of the United States House of Representatives
- Joint Congressional Committee on Inaugural Ceremonies
- Library of Congress
- Medicaid and CHIP Payment and Access Commission
- Medicare Payment Advisory Commission
- Office of Congressional Workplace Rights
- Congressional Office for International Leadership
- Stennis Center for Public Service
- U.S. Botanic Garden
- U.S. Capitol Police
- United States Capitol Visitor Center
