= Regular order (United States Congress) =

Application of committee and subcommittee processes

Regular order within the context of the United States Congress refers to the semi-strict or strict application of committee and subcommittee processes, including public hearing opportunities and the holding of multiple votes. Said processes are designed to promote consensus-based forms of decision making, particularly in terms of fostering accommodations for minority viewpoints. In the context of the broader history of the U.S. Congress, regular order is closely associated with bipartisanship.

In contrast to following regular order, the normal Congressional structure and procedural approach can be somewhat bypassed by organizing task forces that the leadership runs, attempting to reduce the ability to propose amendments and otherwise shorten the length of time a measure is discussed.

Political reporter Ron Elving, of NPR has remarked that "regular order is not only a process, it is also a state of mind."

== See also ==
- Bipartisanship
- History of the United States Congress
- Procedures of the United States Congress
- Structure of the United States Congress
  - List of current United States congressional joint committees
  - United States congressional committee
  - United States congressional subcommittee
