= Multiple referral =

Process

Multiple referral is the process through which a bill is referred to a second committee after the first is finished acting.

In the United States House of Representatives, proposed legislation can be sent to more than one Congressional committee due to a 1975 rules change. Reasons for referring legislation to more than one committee can include: a change in the most important issues; complexity of the legislation; or problems fitting the bill into the jurisdiction of only one committee.

However, as a result of a January 1995 change of the House rules, legislation may not be sent to multiple committees simultaneously. Under those same rules, the Speaker of the House must designate one or more primary committees in a joint referral.

In a split referral, legislation is divided into sections, with each part sent to the appropriate committee.

In a sequential referral, legislation is first sent to one committee, then to the next.

In the Senate, multiple referral can occur when jointly motioned by the leaders of both parties (almost never), or when the Senate grants unanimous consent.
