= Lion Star Fund =

New York City hedge fund

- Company type: Private
- Industry: Investment management
- Founded: 2014
- Founder: Todd Napoli
- Headquarters: New York City
- Area served: Worldwide (non-US)
- Website: www.lionstarfund.com

Lion Star Fund is a hedge fund headquartered in New York City and registered in the British Virgin Islands. It stems from the Lion Star Family Fund, a family office that has shown consistent rates of return. The fund primarily trades and invests in currencies, the indices of developed countries, and commodities like metals.

== History ==
From 2006 to 2013, the fund averaged a realized return of 45.4% per year with a win rate above 80%. By 2014, they had earned over $10 million in investment capital.

The firm has been described as "notoriously private," but, in 2014, they founded the Lion Star Fund to attract outside investors. The fund is registered in the British Virgin Islands and is only available to non-American investors as a way to avoid legislative barriers from the U.S. government and the U.S. Securities and Exchange Commission. They were due to begin accepting clients in 2014.
