= Enrolled bill =

Legislative bill in the United States that has been enacted by a legislature

In the United States Congress, an enrolled bill is the final copy of a bill or joint resolution which has passed both houses of Congress in identical form, and been signed by the clerk of the house or the secretary of the senate.

In the United States, enrolled bills are engrossed—prepared in a formally printed copy—and must be signed by the presiding officers of both houses and sent to the president of the United States for approval. The practice of engrossing a handwritten copy in the style of an illuminated manuscript fell out of favor in the 1790s. The 1789 Constitution of the United States did receive this treatment.

== See also ==
- Enrolled bill rule
