= MSCI Hong Kong Index =

The MSCI Hong Kong Index is a capitalization-weighted stock index designed to measure the performance of the large and mid cap segments of the Hong Kong market. It has 48 constituents, and covers approximately 85% of the free float-adjusted market capitalization of Hong Kong equity stocks. The index is often used in index based passive ETFs that invest in the Hong Kong Stock Exchange such as HSBC MSCI Hong Kong ETF.

It is calculated by MSCI.

== Constituents ==
As of April 2018, the ten largest companies constituting the index included AIA group, Hong Kong exchange and clearing, CK Hutchison holdings, Sun Hung Kai properties, CK Asset holdings, Galaxy entertainment group, Link REIT, Hang Seng bank, BOC Hong Kong holdings and Hong Kong China gas, accounting for a market capitalization of US$ 320 billion.
