= Veteran's pension =

Pension for veterans of the U.S. Armed Forces

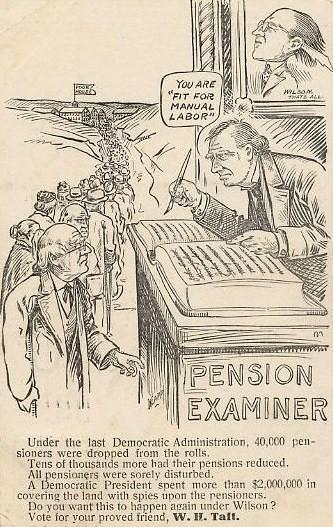
1912 Republican campaign postcard charging a Democratic administration would remove pensioners from the rolls

A veteran's pension or "wartime pension" is a pension for veterans of the United States Armed Forces, who served in the military but did not qualify for military retirement pay from the Armed Forces. It was established by the United States Congress and given to veterans who meet the eligibility requirements. Along with payments, they are also given additional benefits depending on their eligibility and needs. The veteran's pension system is managed by the Department of Veterans Affairs.

== Wartime pension, wartime period ==
The veteran's pension is sometimes called the "wartime pension" due to a requirement that the veteran served at least one day during a U.S. wartime period. The Department of Veterans Affairs publishes a list of Eligible Wartime Periods for determining if the Veteran meets the wartime service criterion. As of February 2017, to determine eligibility for the veteran's pension the Veterans Administration recognizes the following wartime periods:

- Mexican Border Period (May 9, 1916 – April 5, 1917 for Veterans who served in Mexico, on its borders, or adjacent waters)
- World War I (April 6, 1917 – November 11, 1918)
- World War II (December 7, 1941 – December 31, 1946)
- Korean War (June 27, 1950 – January 31, 1955)
- Vietnam War (two periods) February 28, 1961 – May 7, 1975 for Veterans who served in the Republic of Vietnam; or August 5, 1964 – May 7, 1975 for Veterans who served anywhere during the Vietnam War wartime period
- Gulf War (August 2, 1990 – through a future date to be set by Congress, or Presidential Proclamation)

== Wartime exclusions ==
A source of confusion can be use of the term "wartime pension." Some mistakenly interpret this to mean the pension is awarded only to Veterans who participated in combat or served in a combat or war zone. The veteran's and wartime pensions do not require the veteran to have participated in combat, nor to have served in a combat or war zone.

== History ==
A pension plan for disabled veterans was established by congress in 1792. Pension legislation for all surviving veterans was passed in 1818. This was unique to federal legislation. Money was shifted from the national treasury to individuals who were perceived as having the right to preferential treatment. The recipients were entitled to these payments because the pensions were viewed as delayed payments for the people who served during the American Revolution.

== Eligibility ==
Someone is generally eligible for veteran's pension if he or she:

1. Was not discharged for dishonorable reasons; and,
2. Served 90 days of active military duty; and,
3. Served at least one day during wartime ("wartime" as determined by the VA); and,
4. Had countable family income below a certain yearly limit; and,
5. Is age 65 years or older; or
6. Regardless of age is permanently disabled, not due to willful misconduct

== Calculation ==
The annual pension is calculated by adding all of the person's countable income. Any deductions are then subtracted from that total. The remaining total is deducted from the maximum pension limit (taking into account the number of dependents, spouse, etc.). This final number is the yearly pension; dividing it by 12 results in the monthly pension.

== Tax-free benefit ==
The veteran's pension is a tax-free benefit not subject to federal or state income tax.

=== Income received per month ===
- Married veterans – federal tax-free up to $2054 per month
- Single veterans – federal tax-free up to $1732 per month
- Surviving spouses – federal tax-free up to $1113 per month

=== Additional benefits ===
In addition to monthly payments, certain veterans may be eligible for additional benefits such as automobile grants, special adaptive housing, traumatic service members group life insurance, educational benefits and health care.

==== Aid and Attendance ====
Aid and Attendance is an amount awarded in addition to the basic pension. This benefit takes into account a person's unreimbursed (out-of-pocket) medical expenses. These medical expenses are subtracted from a person's gross income to determine eligibility.

A veteran is eligible for Aid and Attendance when he or she

1. Requires the regular aid of another person to perform everyday functions (bathing, eating, dressing, etc.)
2. Is bedridden
3. Is a patient in a nursing home
4. Is blind or nearly blind

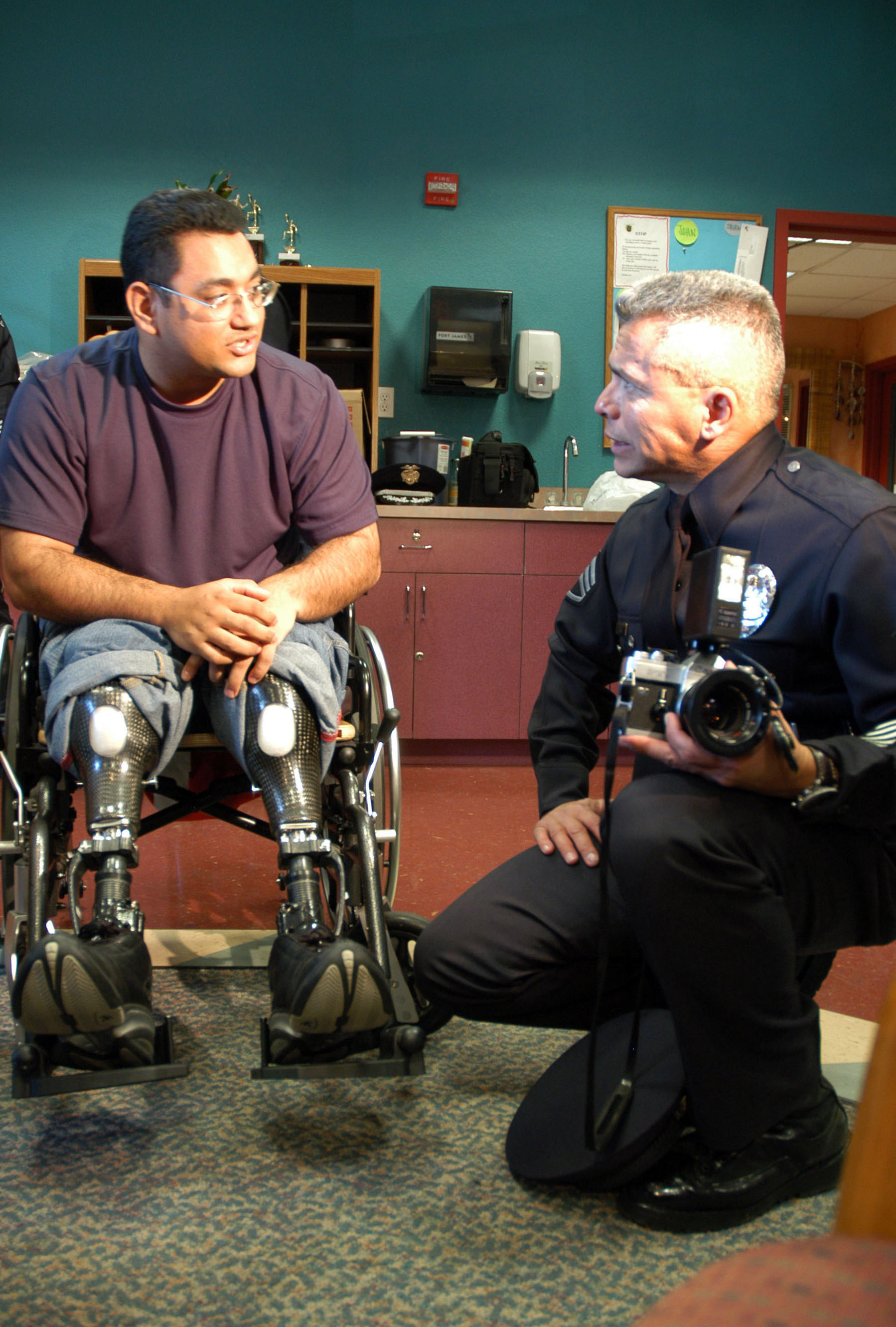
US Navy 051206-N-6843I-097 An injured Sailor speaks with a Los Angeles Police Department (LAPD) officer during a visit to Naval Medical Center San Diego (NMCSD)

==== Housebound ====
A veteran is eligible for housebound benefits when he or she:

1. Has a single permanent disability that results in confinement to his or her immediate premises
2. Has a single permanent disability rated as 100% disabling and a secondary disability rated as 60% disabling

== See also ==
- G.I. Bill
