= MSCI World =

Global Stock Index

MSCI World Price Index (1969-2020)

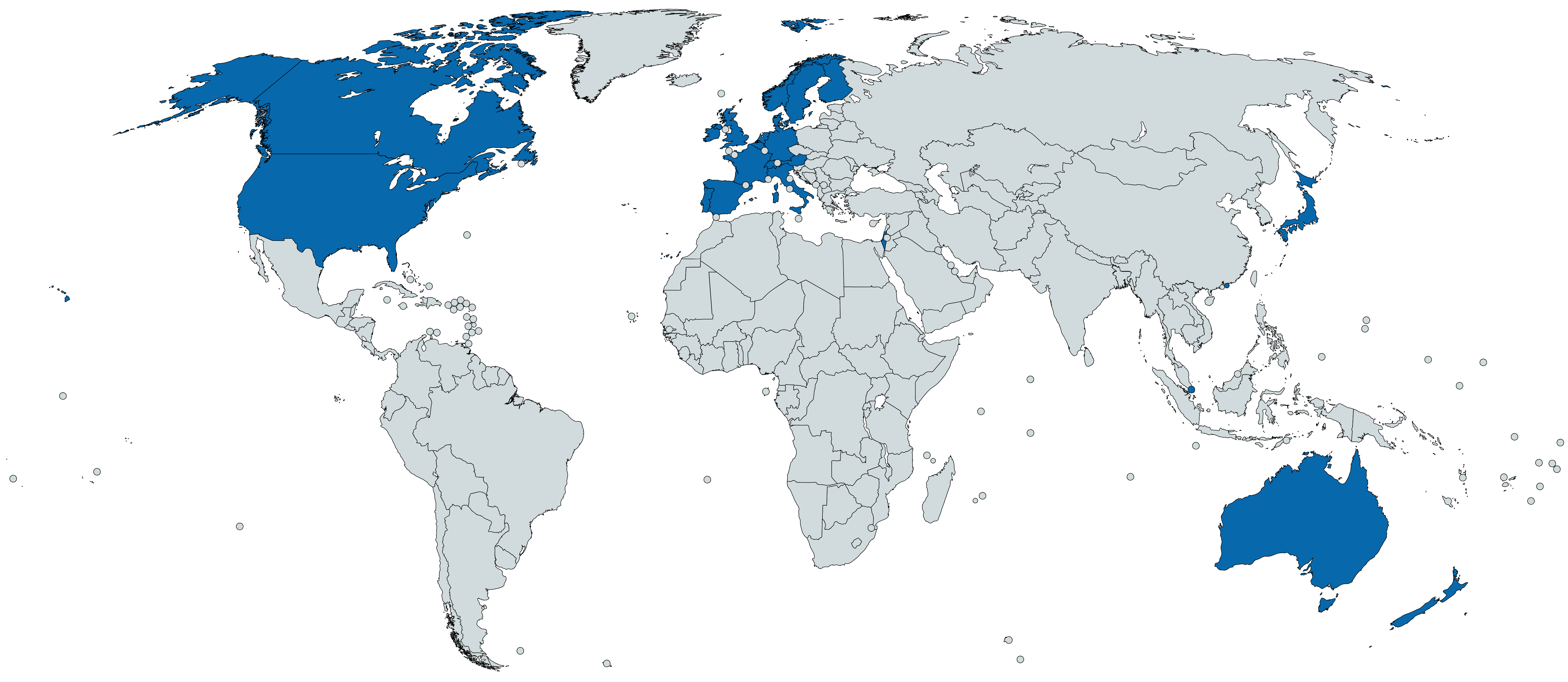
Map of all countries included in the MSCI World index as of 28 Sep 2018

The MSCI World is a widely followed global stock market index that tracks the performance of around 1,300 large and mid-cap companies across 23 developed countries. It is maintained by MSCI, formerly Morgan Stanley Capital International, and is used as a common benchmark for global stock funds intended to represent a broad cross-section of global markets.

The index includes a collection of stocks of all the developed markets in the world, as defined by MSCI. The exclusion of stocks from emerging and frontier economies makes the index narrower in global coverage than the name suggests. A related index, the MSCI All Country World Index (ACWI), incorporates both developed and emerging countries. MSCI also produces a Frontier Markets index, including another 31 markets.

The MSCI World Index has been calculated since 1969, in various forms: without dividends (Price Index), with net or with gross dividends reinvested (Net and Gross Index), in US dollars, Euro and local currencies.

== Index composition methodology ==
The MSCI World Index is constructed by classifying equity securities from countries with developed markets into large-cap and mid-cap segments based on their free float-adjusted market capitalization.

Market capitalization refers to the total market value of a company's outstanding shares, calculated as the share price multiplied by the total number of shares. In MSCI's methodology, this figure is adjusted to include only the public float: meaning only shares readily available for public trading (also known as the "free float") are counted, excluding those held by insiders, governments, or other holders who are unlikely to trade.

Within each developed market country, MSCI ranks companies by their free float-adjusted market capitalization and includes:

- Large-cap stocks: companies that collectively account for approximately the top 70% of the cumulative market capitalization
- Mid-cap stocks: companies that bring the cumulative total of market capitalization up to 85%

The MSCI index excludes the remaining 15% of market capitalization segment, corresponding to small-cap stocks.

This segmentation ensures that the MSCI World Index captures 85% of the investable equity universe in each country, providing broad coverage of developed market equities.

== Market classification methodology ==
MSCI evaluates a country's equity market as "developed" if all of the following criteria are met:

Criterion	Threshold (June 2025 framework)	Purpose
Economic development	Gross National Income (GNI) per capita ≥ 125 % of the World Bank high-income threshold (i.e., ≥ USD $17,506 based on the USD $14,005 2023 benchmark) for three consecutive years	Demonstrates sustained high income level
Size and liquidity (entry requirement)	≥ 5 companies that, in each of the last eight index reviews, individually satisfy: full market cap ≥ USD $5.9 billion; and; free-float cap ≥ USD $3.0 billion; and; 12-month annualized traded value ratio (ATVR) ≥ 20 %	Ensures a sufficiently deep investable universe
Size and liquidity (maintenance requirement)	Even after inclusion, ≥ 1 company must continue to meet the above size-and-liquidity figures, and the market must retain ≥ 5 securities in its investable equity universe	Preserves index stability
Market accessibility	Rated "Very High" or "Unrestricted" across the five sub-criteria: openness to foreign ownership, free capital flows, efficient operational framework, unrestricted investment instruments, a stable institutional environment	Guarantees seamless access for global investors

MSCI monitors all countries continuously, but formal reclassification consultations occur each spring, with decisions announced the following June and implemented in quarterly index reviews. Off-cycle announcements are reserved for exceptional market events.

== Country representation ==
The index includes companies domiciled in the following 23 countries:

- Australia
- Austria
- Belgium
- Canada
- Denmark
- Finland
- France
- Germany
- Hong Kong
- Ireland
- Israel
- Italy
- Japan
- Netherlands
- New Zealand
- Norway
- Portugal
- Singapore
- Spain
- Sweden
- Switzerland
- United Kingdom
- United States

== Sector representation ==
Sector weights in MSCI World Index as of July 2025
1. Information Technology (26.9%)
2. Financials (16.7%)
3. Industrials (11.4%)
4. Consumer Discretionary (10.1%)
5. Health Care (9.12%)
6. Consumer Staples (5.75%)
7. Communication Services (8.48%)
8. Energy (3.52%)
9. Materials (3.15%)
10. Utilities (2.65%)
11. Real Estate (1.97%)

Companies are divided into sectors using the Global Industry Classification Standard. The aggregate distribution of companies that comprise the index is shown here in the pie chart, with information technology being the biggest sector with more than 26% as of July 2025.

== Total annual returns ==
Year	Gross Annual Return (a)
1970	−1.98%
1971	19.56%
1972	23.55%
1973	−14.51%
1974	−24.48%
1975	34.50%
1976	14.71%
1977	5.00%
1978	18.22%
1979	12.67%
1980	27.72%
1981	−3.30%
1982	11.27%
1983	23.28%
1984	5.77%
1985	41.77%
1986	42.80%
1987	16.76%
1988	23.95%
1989	17.19%
1990	−16.52%
1991	18.97%
1992	−4.66%
1993	23.13%
1994	5.58%
1995	21.32%
1996	14.00%
1997	16.23%
1998	24.80%
1999	25.34%
2000	−12.92%
2001	−16.52%
2002	−19.54%
2003	33.76%
2004	15.25%
2005	10.02%
2006	20.65%
2007	9.57%
2008	−40.33%
2009	30.79%
2010	12.34%
2011	−5.02%
2012	16.54%
2013	27.37%
2014	5.50%
2015	−0.32%
2016	8.15%
2017	23.07%
2018	−8.20%
2019	28.40%
2020	16.50%
2021	22.35%
2022	−17.73%
2023	24.42%
2024	19.19%
2025	21.60%

- (a) Total returns including reinvested dividends.

== See also ==
- FTSE Global Equity Index Series (FTSE All-World Index)
- Exchange-traded fund
- MSCI EAFE
- S&P Global 100
- S&P Global 1200
- Stock market index
- JPMorgan EMBI
- Country risk
