= Bloomberg US Aggregate Bond Index =

Financial market index

The Bloomberg US Aggregate Bond Index, or the Agg, is a broad base, market capitalization-weighted bond market index representing intermediate term investment grade bonds traded in the United States. Investors frequently use the index as a stand-in for measuring the performance of the US bond market.

In addition to investment grade corporate debt, the index tracks government debt, mortgage-backed securities (MBS) and asset-backed securities (ABS) to simulate the universe of investable bonds that meet certain criteria. In order to be included in the Agg, bonds must be of investment grade, have an outstanding par value of at least $100 million and have at least one year until maturity.

Index funds and exchange-traded funds are available that track this bond index.

The index has been maintained by Bloomberg L.P. since August 24, 2016. Prior to then it was known as the Barclays Capital Aggregate Bond Index and was maintained by Barclays. Prior to November 3, 2008, it was known as the Lehman Aggregate Bond Index and maintained by the now defunct Lehman Brothers.

== History ==
The precursor to the Bloomberg US Aggregate Bond Index was co-created on July 7, 1973, by Art Lipson and John Roundtree, both of Kuhn, Loeb & Co., a boutique investment bank. Lipson and Roundtree created two total-return indexes focused on US bonds: the US Government and the US Investment Grade Corporate Indexes. The indexes were blended in 1979 to form the Government/Credit Index. In 1986, mortgage backed securities were also added to the index, which was renamed the US Aggregate Index and backfilled with historical data to 1976.

It was later renamed the Barclays Capital Aggregate Bond Index.

The index was acquired by Bloomberg L.P. in August 2016 as part of a larger sale of the bank's index and risk analytics business. The index was subsequently renamed the Bloomberg Barclays US Aggregate Bond Index. Upon its acquisition, Bloomberg and Barclays announced that the index would be co-branded for an initial term of five years. In August 2021, Bloomberg announced the renaming of the index as the Bloomberg US Aggregate Bond Index.

== Index characteristics ==
The Bloomberg US Aggregate Bond Index is a market capitalization-weighted index, meaning the securities in the index are weighted according to the market size of each bond type. Most U.S. traded investment grade bonds are represented. Municipal bonds, and Treasury Inflation-Protected Securities are excluded, due to tax treatment issues. The index includes Treasury securities, Government agency bonds, Mortgage-backed bonds, Corporate bonds, and a number of foreign bonds traded in U.S.

The Bloomberg US Aggregate Bond Index is an intermediate term index. The weighted average maturity as of July 1, 2022 was 8.76 years.

== Investing ==
Many index funds and exchange-traded funds attempt to replicate (before fees and expenses) the performance of the Bloomberg US Aggregate Bond Index. Some examples of such funds include iShares Core US Aggregate Bond Index (AGG), Thrift Savings Plan (F Fund) Fixed Income Index fund, Vanguard Total Bond Market Index Fund (VBMFX), and Fidelity U.S. Bond Index Fund (FXNAX). Fund managers sometimes subdivide the different parts of the Aggregate by maturity or sector for managing individual portfolios. The Municipal section of the index is the only part of the index that cannot be used for this purpose - because municipal debt is issued by so many different entities, the Municipals in the Aggregate are only intended to be representative, and Bloomberg maintains separate indices for maintaining Municipal-only portfolios.

== Criticism ==
Some investors have criticized the use of the Agg as a representation of the performance of the entire US fixed income universe. Because the benchmark was founded in the 1970s, and some of its data dates back to only 1986, a time when interest rates began to decline from all-time highs, the index has only seen a few years of negative returns.

Additionally, approximately one-third of the Agg is US Treasuries, which exposes the index to US monetary policy. The exclusion of high yield, foreign-denominated and municipal bonds, as well as certain mortgage backed securities also limits the index.

== See also ==
- Index fund
- Bond market index
