= Military retirement (United States) =

System of benefits in the US military

Military retirement in the United States is a system of benefits designed to improve the quality and retention of personnel recruited to and retained within the United States military. These benefits are technically not a veterans pension, but a retainer payment, as retired service members are eligible to be reactivated. The United States has maintained a military retirement program in one form or another since the mid-1800s. The Blended Retirement System (BRS) is the current iteration of military retirement for the United States Armed Forces. The Blended Retirement System combines the defined-benefit retirement system known as "High-3" with an employer matching supplement. Service members with a DIEUS (Date of Initial Entry to Uniformed Services) prior to January 1, 2018 are eligible to continue service under the previous system or may elect to join the BRS. All new recruits to the United States military joining on or after January 1, 2018 will automatically be enrolled in the BRS.

== Military retirement prior to World War II ==
In the years before the Second World War, the retirement systems of the United States military were highly varied between the different branches of service. In 1916, the military instituted new "up or out" policies, forcing the retirement of members who were not selected for promotion in a prescribed amount of time. In conjunction with these reforms, the military began using what has become the "standard" calculation for retirement compensation of 2.5% of base pay, multiplied by years of service, with a maximum payout of 75% of base pay in retirement. For example, a soldier retiring after 25 years of service would be eligible for a payment equal to 62.5% of his base pay at the time of his retirement. This method of calculation has remained ingrained in the military retirement system to present day.

== Post-World War II retirement ==
Since the Second World War, the baseline of military retirement has been the 20-year retirement. Under such a program, service members have been eligible for retirement payments after 20 years of active duty. Service members received a defined benefit payment upon retirement, payable until the death of the beneficiary. The benefit received was calculated using 2.5% of a member's base pay at the time of retirement, multiplied by years of service. This basic calculation would remain in place until after the Vietnam War.

== Retirement reforms ==
Mounting costs led Congress to pursue reforms to the military retirement system during the 1980s. Under the National Defense Authorization Act of 1981, the military moved from calculating retirement benefits based on the "final pay," or base pay on the final day of active service, to the "High-3" system. Under "High-3," the retirement payment of a service member would be based upon the average of the highest 36 months of base pay earned within a career. This allowed the government to reduce payments and realize some savings, without major structural changes to the "twenty year retirement".

Under the Military Retirement Reform Act of 1986, efforts were made to further reduce the burden of military retirement payments by introducing the "REDUX" system. The legislation reduced the multiplier for years of service up to 20 years from 2.5% to 2.0%. As such, a member retiring with 20 years of service would rate a monthly payment equal to 40% of the highest-paid 36 months of service. This represented a 20% drop in compensation from the preceding system. Years of service beyond 20 years applied a multiple of 3.5%, which allowed long-serving members who achieved 30 years of service to continue to receive the maximum 75% of their pay in retirement. This system remained in place until 1999, when President Clinton repealed the "REDUX" system as part of the National Defense Authorization Act of Fiscal Year 2000. This legislation gave service members the option to retain the REDUX system or fall under the old "High-3" model.

== Blended Retirement System ==
After years of fighting the Global War on Terror, the cost of military health care and retirement benefits were growing at a rate defense officials found concerning. In an era in which employers offered fewer traditional pensions, the military provided defined benefit retirement to service members who retired at an average age of 47 and younger, which was viewed by fiscal hawks as overly generous. Additionally, service members who failed to reach the 20-year vesting mark left the service with no accrued benefits, unlike the typical civilian. As a result, Congress instituted the most comprehensive reforms to military retirement since World War I.

With the backing of influential Senators such as John McCain, civilian and military leaders created a hybrid retirement system designed to leverage civilian investment vehicles to reduce costs. The National Defense Authorization Act for Fiscal Year 2016 created the "Blended Retirement System" (BRS), which combines a reduced defined benefit with an employer-matched contribution. Under the BRS, service members will still receive a defined benefit retirement payment after 20 years of service, at a reduced multiplier of 2.0% per year of service. The Defense Department contributes 1% of a member's base pay automatically, and will match service member contributions up to 5% of the base salary. These funds are managed within the pre-existing Thrift Savings Plan, and vest after two years of service, allowing separating service members who do not serve a full career to 'roll-over' earned benefits to their next civilian retirement plan. The Department of Defense estimates saving $2 billion per year from these reforms on the $150 billion currently spent on military retirement and healthcare.
