= Thrift Savings Plan =

Retirement plan for U.S. federal government employees and uniformed service members

TSP logo

The Thrift Savings Plan (TSP) is a defined contribution plan for United States civil service employees and retirees and for members of the uniformed services. As of December 31, 2024, TSP has about 7.2 million participants (of whom about 4.2 million are actively participating through payroll deductions), and more than $963.3 billion in assets under management; it purports to be the world's largest defined contribution plan. The TSP is administered by the Federal Retirement Thrift Investment Board, an independent agency. (Note: This article incorporates public domain material from TSP Uniserv Features ch#1, The Thrift Savings Plan 2004-02-20. Thrift Savings Plan.)

The TSP is one of three components of the Federal Employees Retirement System (FERS; the others are the FERS annuity and Social Security) and is designed to closely resemble the dynamics of private sector 401(k) and Roth 401k plans (TSP implemented a Roth option in May 2012). It is also open to employees covered by the older Civil Service Retirement System (CSRS) but with far fewer benefits (mainly the lack of matching contributions).

== History ==
"Established by Congress in the Federal Employees’ Retirement System Act of 1986, the TSP offers the same types of savings and tax benefits that many private corporations offer their employees under 401(k) plans."

== Eligibility ==
Civil Service Retirement System (CSRS) employees may join at any time, but are not automatically enrolled.

Service members in the Blended Retirement System (BRS) are automatically enrolled in the TSP at 5% of their base pay. Members of the military in the Legacy Retirement System may enroll in the TSP anytime but are not automatically enrolled.

Federal Employees Retirement System (FERS) employees hired on or after October 1, 2020, are automatically enrolled upon hire, and 5% of base pay is automatically withheld unless the employee elects not to participate. Those hired between August 1, 2010, and September 30, 2020 (inclusive) were automatically enrolled upon hire with 3% of base pay withheld; employees hired on or before July 31, 2010, were not automatically enrolled and had to opt-in (initially after a waiting period of six months, this requirement was later dropped).

== Contributing and vesting ==
An employee or uniformed service member may change, stop, or restart contributions, at any time, with very few exceptions noted below.

=== Employee contributions ===
As of October 1, 2020, new civilian employees and service members in the BRS are automatically enrolled in the TSP with a 5% deduction from their gross pay being deposited into the age-appropriate (Note: The fund chosen is based on an assumed age of 63 as to when withdrawals will begin.) Lifecycle (L) Fund, unless they make another choice or choose not to participate. Employees hired before then either contribute automatically at 3% or do not have any automatic contributions and had/have to opt-in to TSP; their contribution levels did not change when the newer rules were implemented.

All FERS and CSRS employees and members of the uniformed services may contribute up to the Internal Revenue Code limitation, which is $22,500 for 2023. The contribution for FERS and CSRS for civilian employees may be either a specific dollar amount or a percentage of pay (whole dollars or whole percentages only), while uniformed service members can only elect a percentage of pay; any amounts will be adjusted once the annual IRC limitation is reached. Once the contribution amount is selected, it automatically renews each year at the same amount or percentage until the participant elects otherwise.

In addition, participants age 50 (Note: So long as the employee turns 50 during a year, whether on January 1 or December 31 or any other day of the year, an employee may make catch-up contributions at any time during the year.) or older may also make "catch-up" contributions up to the IRC limitation, which is $7,500 for 2023. The catch-up contributions are tax-deferred and allow age eligible participants to defer up to $30,000 for 2023 in their TSP account.

Civilian employees may only contribute from regular pay (the standard pay for their grade plus applicable locality pay); they cannot contribute from bonuses or any overtime.

Uniformed service members are permitted to make contributions from both basic pay as well as from incentive, special, or bonus pay, but are subject to the regular contribution limits. Members of the uniformed services who deploy to designated combat zones are subject to the combat zone tax exclusion, which allows tax-exempt income earned. Contributions to the TSP by uniformed service members in a combat zone are contributed to the TSP as tax-exempt, and accrue tax-deferred earnings. Tax-exempt contributions are not subject to the IRC elective deferral limit.

Participants who are both civilian federal employees and members of the uniformed services will have two separate TSP accounts if they elect to contribute while in civilian and/or uniformed service status; however, the total tax-deferred contributions in both may not exceed the IRC elective deferral or catch-up limits.

In addition, the total tax-deferred, tax-exempt, and agency contributions made to both TSP accounts are subject to the IRC Section 415(c) overall limitation, which is $58,000 for 2021. Catch-up contributions made are in addition to the elective deferral and 415(c) limits.

Participants may also roll over existing 401(k) or Individual Retirement Accounts (traditional IRAs only) into the TSP.

=== Matching contributions ===
All FERS employees automatically have 1% of base pay contributed by their agency, even if the employee does not participate in TSP; the employee cannot waive this requirement. Additional matching contributions are made dollar-per-dollar up to 3% of base pay (e.g. an employee contributing 3% will have 1% automatically contributed plus 3% matched, for a total of 4%), then at $0.50/$1 for each additional dollar up to 5% of base pay; neither amounts above 5% nor "catch-up" contributions are matched, regardless of an employee's base pay.

CSRS employees (including CSRS Offset employees) are ineligible for automatic or matching contributions.

Uniformed service members under the legacy system are eligible for matching contributions only if the secretary of the specific service designates as such (none have ever been designated as such). However, in 2006, Congress enacted legislation to sponsor a pilot program to offer matching contributions to new active duty enlistees. This program was administered by the Department of the Army from April 1, 2006, through December 31, 2008. Enlistees who qualified for TSP matching during this period (provided completion and returned paperwork was processed as of initial enlistment) receive a dollar for dollar matching contribution on the first three percent of their contributions from basic pay; and fifty cents on the dollar for the next two percent contributed for the duration of their first term of enlistment. The program has since ended. Beginning in 2018, the Blended Retirement System (BRS) for members of the uniformed services applies automatically to new enlistees (who may receive matching contributions after two years) and to current members who opted in (those members begin receiving matching contributions automatically).

=== Vesting requirements ===
Employees are fully vested from day one for any employee and agency matching contributions, and earnings thereon.

FERS employees must generally complete three years of Federal civilian service to be fully vested in agency automatic contributions and earnings thereon (certain FERS employees and Members of Congress, as well as military members, have only a two-year requirement), otherwise the separated employee loses the unvested amount (except in cases of death, in which case the amounts will deem to be vested). Military and civilian service cannot be combined to meet vesting requirements.

=== Administrative Expenses ===
TSP considers (and regularly promotes that) its operating expenses are extremely low by comparison to privately operated mutual funds. (Note: The average is around $0.40/$1,000 invested, plus additional fees of around $0.005/$1,000 paid to the managers of the Funds other than the G Fund which is administered in house.) This is due to the expenses being subsidized by three major sources: matching contributions and earnings thereon forfeited due to departing employees not meeting vesting requirements, excess agency contributions and earnings forfeited due to retirement plan corrections (this involves employees placed in FERS who were eligible for, and chose to be placed in, the older CSRS plan), and loan participation fees. However, those sources do not completely cover total expenses, and therefore the balance is taken from investment earnings.

== Investment options ==
=== Fund selection ===
The TSP offers investors 16 funds in which to invest, in both traditional and Roth versions (but all agency automatic and matching contributions are placed in the traditional version of the fund(s) selected). Five are individual funds (one dealing with government bonds and the other four tracking specific market indices) while the other 11 are target date funds (referred to as "Lifecycle" or "L" Funds) designed to professionally change the allocation mix of investments among the individual funds during various stages of the employee's federal service and composed of various percentages of the individual funds. All TSP funds are trust funds regulated by the Office of the Comptroller of the Currency and not the Securities and Exchange Commission; thus, there is no ticker symbol to track performance (though with the individual funds except the G Fund, the comparable index is easily tracked).

Employees may choose from any or all of the individual or Lifecycle funds in which to invest (any allocation must be expressed as a whole percentage) and may change their allocation for future pay periods at any time (if the request is received before noon Eastern time it is usually effective as of the close of business that day; otherwise, it is effective the next business day). If no selection is made, the default is 100% allocation into an "age-appropriate" L Fund (except for uniformed services, whose default is the G Fund). As all funds except the G Fund have a potential risk of loss of principal, employees must acknowledge this risk before investing in those funds.

Participants may also change the allocation percentage of their existing fund balances (referred to as "Interfund Transfers"). They may choose to allocate existing balances differently than new contributions, but are limited to two unrestricted transfers per calendar month; all subsequent transfers must be into the G Fund only.

Since 2022, TSP has also offered a "mutual fund window" that allows participants to invest part (but not all) of their balances in private-sector mutual funds. The window has very strict limits on how much can be invested therein (no more that 25% of a participant's balance can be invested in the window) and high fees designed to prevent non-participants from subsidizing those who wish to use the window (the TSP charges an "annual administrative fee", an "annual maintenance fee", and a "per-trade fee", in addition to whatever fees the fund in which one invests charges).

=== Individual funds ===
- G Fund – Government Securities fund. These are unique government securities specifically issued to the TSP (thus, not available to the general public) and earn interest set by law at the weighted average yield on outstanding US Treasury securities with four or more years to maturity. Since these securities are backed by the full faith and credit of the US Government; the G Fund is the only fund with no risk of loss of principal. The G Fund was the initial fund established by the TSP when it began operations on April 1, 1987. (Note: From time to time G Fund securities issuance is suspended when the overall Federal debt ceiling is reached; in those cases, amounts are credited to the account as if activity was continuing; once the debt ceiling is lifted all amounts due plus accrued interest are paid.)
- F Fund – Fixed Income Index fund. Invested in BlackRock's U.S. Debt Index Fund. Tracks the Bloomberg Barclays US Aggregate Bond Index. The F Fund was opened to Federal employees in January 1988 but was limited to only a portion of contributions; beginning January 1991 all restrictions on F Fund contributions were lifted.
- C Fund – Common Stock Index fund. Invested in BlackRock's Equity Index Fund. Replicates the total return version of the S&P 500 index. The C Fund also opened to employees in January 1988 and was subject to the same restrictions as the F Fund until January 1991.
- S Fund – Small Capitalization Stock Index fund. Invested in BlackRock's Extended Market Index Fund, which tracks the Dow Jones U.S. Completion TSM index. The S Fund opened to employees in May 2001.
- I Fund – International Stock Index fund. Invested in BlackRock's EAFE Index Fund. Replicates the net version of the MSCI EAFE index. The I Fund opened to employees in May 2001.

=== Lifecycle Funds ===
Lifecycle Funds (commonly referred to as L Funds) are target date funds which, over an extended period of time (typically the period between an employee's entry/re-entry into Federal service and a presumed age of 63 for first withdrawal), allow for automatic reallocation (Note: Currently the Fund managers reallocate assets quarterly.) of assets from more-risky stock funds (the C, I, and S Funds) into less-risky income funds (the F and G Funds) as an employee reaches retirement age, as an employee may lack the time, interest, and/or expertise to determine suitable investments at various life stages. As mentioned, new employees are automatically placed into the L Fund corresponding to a presumed age of 63 for first withdrawal, but may choose to invest in any of the L Funds.

Originally the Lifecycle Funds were offered only in 10-year increments (those with years ending in 0). However, on July 1, 2020, the TSP introduced new Lifecycle Funds in five-year increments (years ending in either 0 or 5).

When a new fund is added, the L Fund with that year in its title will be retired and merged into the L Income Fund, and a new fund will be created with the year in its title that is 50 years in the future. As examples, the L2010 and L2020 Funds were retired on December 31, 2010, and June 30, 2020, respectively, while the L2025 fund was retired on June 30, 2025. In 2030, the L2030 fund will be retired and merged into the L Income Fund, while the L2080 Fund will be created.

The current Lifecycle Funds established, along with the corresponding estimated retirement date window, are as follows:

- L2075 - Retirement date of 2073 and thereafter
- L2070 – Retirement date between 2068 and 2072
- L2065 – Retirement date between 2063 and 2067
- L2060 – Retirement date between 2058 and 2062
- L2055 – Retirement date between 2053 and 2057
- L2050 – Retirement date between 2048 and 2052
- L2045 – Retirement date between 2043 and 2047
- L2040 – Retirement date between 2038 and 2042
- L2035 – Retirement date between 2033 and 2037
- L2030 – Retirement date between 2028 and 2032
- L Income – Individuals currently receiving monthly payments or who plan to retire before 2028

=== Simulating TSP portfolios ===
Because TSP funds are not offered in the public market (especially the G Fund as those securities are special to the TSP), it can be difficult to backtest TSP portfolios. However, most TSP funds track well-known indices and can be approximated using low-cost funds offered to the general public. Below is a list of Vanguard Exchange-Traded Funds (ETFs) that are equivalent to the TSP funds in terms of their content.

- C Fund – VOO
- S Fund – VXF
- I Fund – VEA
- F Fund – BND
- G Fund – VGSH

The TSP can also be approximated by tracking the performance of the index each fund seeks to match.

- C Fund – .INX (S&P 500)
- S Fund – DWCPF (Dow Jones U.S. Completion Total Stock Market Index)
- I Fund – MSCI EAFE (MSCI EAFE (Europe, Australasia, Far East) Index)
- F Fund – XIUSA000MC (Bloomberg Barclays US Aggregate Bond Index)

L funds can be approximated by mixing the above ETFs in percentages matching the allocation percentage of each individual component. For example, the L 2050 fund allocation may be simulated by a portfolio consisting of 41.9% VOO, 24.9% VEA, 17.95% VXF, 9.77% VGSH, and 5.48% BND.

== TSP withdrawals ==
=== Military Members and the Blended Retirement System ===
Military members in the Blended Retirement System (BRS), implemented in 2018, receive automatic 1% TSP contributions and matching contributions up to 5% of basic pay. This replaced the legacy High-3 retirement system for most service members who entered service after January 1, 2018.

Military-specific TSP considerations include:

- Combat zone contributions - Service members in designated combat zones can contribute tax-free income to Roth TSP, providing tax-free growth and withdrawals
- Continuation pay - Mid-career bonus under BRS (between 8-12 years of service) that many members contribute directly to TSP
- Deployment maximization - Reduced living expenses during deployment allow higher contribution rates
- Automatic enrollment - New service members are automatically enrolled at 5% contribution rate to maximize matching

Strategic TSP management requires balancing traditional (pre-tax) and Roth (post-tax) contributions, especially during deployments when tax-free income makes Roth contributions particularly advantageous.

=== During employment ===
==== Loan program ====
There are two types of loans available (a general-purpose loan and a loan for a primary residence (Note: This type of loan requires an actual residence to be bought or built; it cannot be used "for refinancing or prepaying an existing mortgage, for renovations or repairs, for buying out another person’s share in one's current residence, or for the purchase of land only".))/ An employee can have only two loans active at any one time, either two general-purpose loans or a general-purpose and a primary residence loan (an employee cannot have two primary residence loans).

The minimum loan amount is $1,000 and the maximum is $50,000, but the employee must have sufficient assets in the account to take out a loan. The minimum term is one year; the maximum term is five years for the general-purpose loan and 15 years for the residence loan. There is a processing fee per loan which is taken out of the loan proceeds (the amounts are $100 for a residence loan and $50 for a general-purpose loan). If the employee or service member is married the spouse (even if separated) must consent to the loan.

Loans must be repaid via payroll deduction (though an employee may also make additional repayments outside this process) and the interest rate charged (which is fixed for the life of the loan) is the G Fund return rate at the time the application is processed. After repayment an employee must wait 60 days before applying for another loan of the same type. If the employee separates from federal service before the loan is paid, the employee must repay the loan balance within 90 days, or it will be reported as taxable income. In addition, any overdue amount not repaid by the end of the following calendar quarter is also reported as taxable income.

==== In-service withdrawals ====
Employees may make either an "age-based" withdrawal or a "financial hardship" withdrawal. The minimum withdrawal amount is $1,000 (or the account balance, if smaller). For married FERS employees and uniformed service members the spouse must consent to the withdrawal; for married CSRS employees the spouse need only be notified. Any funds withdrawn cannot be repaid to the TSP and subject the employee to both taxes (including penalties if the employee is under 59 1/2) and loss of potential future earnings. Also, if an employee has multiple TSP accounts, s/he can withdraw from any related to active employment (civilian or "Ready Reserve") but cannot withdraw from an inactive one (e.g., former military service).

An employee must be over age 59 1/2 to request an "age-based" withdrawal and need not specify any reason for doing so. Employees may make up to four such withdrawals per calendar year; the prior requirement for a 30-day period between withdrawals was removed in 2024.

A "financial hardship" withdrawal can only be made once every six months and is limited to one of five specific needs:

- negative monthly cash flow,
- medical expenses (including household improvements needed for medical care),
- personal casualty losses,
- legal expenses for separation or divorce, or
- losses as a result of a major disaster (which must be declared by FEMA).

=== Post-employment ===
Separated and retired participants are not eligible for TSP loans.

Participants who retire before turning 59 1/2 and who withdraw their balances (either in a lump sum, partial withdrawal, or by annuity) are not subject to the early withdrawal penalty.

Participants who leave Federal service may leave their accounts with the TSP, roll over the TSP accounts into an IRA or (if leaving for a non-Federal employer, and where eligible) a retirement account with the new employer, subject to the requirements below.

Upon separation, any balances less than $200 (but at least $5) will be automatically cashed out in a single payment; amounts less than $5 are not automatically cashed out and are forfeited to the TSP, but the participant may later request payment. The participant then has 60 days to complete the rollover of the funds to a qualifying account to preserve their tax-deferred status.

For participants having balances of $200 or more, upon separation the following options are available (spouses' rights apply when the balance exceeds $3,500):

- A participant may leave their funds in the TSP, but if the employee does not withdraw the entire balance (or receive monthly payments or purchase an annuity) by April 1 of the year following the year the member turns age 72 (or, if the member separated from Federal service after age 72, the year following separation; unlike IRA rules which require withdrawal at that time regardless of employment status) required minimum distributions will be made per tax laws.
- A participant may request a partial withdrawal provided that the balance is at least $1,000.
- A participant may request a full withdrawal in a combination of any or all of the following options:
  - A single payment (which may be rolled over into a qualifying retirement account),
  - Periodic payments (monthly, quarterly, or annually) based on a dollar amount or request TSP compute lifetime payments (these may be changed no sooner than every 30 days, may be rolled over into a qualifying retirement account, and at any time the participant may request a final single payment of the remaining balance; also an employee may request a partial withdrawal along with periodic payments), and/or
  - A life annuity (provided there is at least $3,500 available in the account to purchase the annuity), based on one of several different features depending on what is chosen (single life or joint, survivor benefit, cash refund or "10-year certain").
  - A participant who requests a single and/or certain monthly payments may roll over their payment(s) into a qualifying retirement account.

If an employee has both a traditional and a Roth account, withdrawals may be made from one or the other, or proportionally from both (but if one account reaches zero future withdrawals will be made from the other). For employees having multiple TSP accounts, the rules apply to each account separately. However, an employee cannot choose to withdraw from only certain funds (e.g. only from the C Fund), any withdrawals are made proportionally across all funds.

Any funds remaining in a TSP account will accrue earnings and participants may make interfund transfer allocation changes to the balance.

=== Payment at Death ===
If a participant dies, then any unpaid balance is paid to the beneficiary(ies) designated. If the participant did not designate any beneficiary(ies), then the "statutory order of precedence" (Note: The order of precedence is also used for payment of insurance benefits under the FEGLI, unused portions of a Federal Employees Retirement System (FERS) annuity, and unpaid compensation.) is used, as follows:

- To the widow or widower,
- To any surviving children (in equal shares) or their descendants,
- To any surviving parent or parents,
- To the court-appointed executor or administrator of the estate,
- To the next of kin as determined by the laws of the state where the employee/retiree lived at death.
