= Developed market =

Country that is most developed in terms of its economy and capital markets

World map showing FTSE's April 2026 Classification of Equity Markets. Developed Markets Advanced Emerging Markets (Note: FTSE Advanced Emerging is a market that has some characteristics of a developed market, but does not fully meet its standards.)

In finance and economics, a developed market (also advanced economy) is a country or jurisdiction that possesses a highly advanced economy, sophisticated financial market infrastructure, and mature capital markets. The term is primarily used by international financial institutions, index providers, and investment professionals to categorize national economies for the purposes of investing, economic analysis, and policy formulation. It is contrasted with emerging markets and frontier markets, which are at earlier stages of economic and financial development.

== Definition and criteria ==
No single, universally accepted definition of a developed market exists, as international organizations, rating agencies, and financial institutions apply varying baseline criteria. Despite these differences, classifications consistently rely on a core set of macroeconomic benchmarks. Chief among these are high gross domestic product (GDP) and gross national income (GNI) per capita, which typically reflect advanced levels of industrialization and a predominant shift toward a service economy. These economic indicators generally correlate with high standards of living, extensive public infrastructure, and elevated life expectancy.

Financial market maturity serves as a critical secondary determinant for classification. Developed markets are characterized by highly liquid, deep, and well-established financial systems, including robust stock, bond, and foreign exchange markets. To sustain this liquidity, these economies maintain high levels of openness to foreign investment, efficient regulatory oversight, and legal frameworks that permit the relatively unrestricted movement of international capital.

The operational stability of these markets is underpinned by strong institutional governance and political stability. Developed market frameworks require robust legal systems that predictably enforce contracts, protect investor interests, and uphold private property rights. The presence of transparent regulatory bodies and consistent public institutions reduces sovereign risk and systemic risk, fostering the predictable economic environment necessary for large-scale commerce.

== Classification ==
Several major international organizations and index providers classify countries or territories into developed or comparable categories, using their own methodologies.

=== MSCI ===
World map showing the MSCI 2025 market classification for Developed Markets and Emerging Markets.

MSCI, a leading global index provider, evaluates equity markets annually to determine whether they should be classified as developed, emerging, frontier, or standalone. The MSCI Market Classification Framework uses three main criteria, which include economic development, which considers the sustainability of economic development and is primarily used to determine developed-market status; size and liquidity requirements, which determine which securities meet the minimum investability requirements for the MSCI Global Standard Indexes; and market accessibility, which reflects the experiences of international institutional investors in accessing and transacting in a given equity market, based on five criteria.

The MSCI World Index tracks large and mid-cap stocks across nations that successfully meet these developed-market standards. As of December 2025, the index encompassed 23 markets: Australia, Austria, Belgium, Canada, Denmark, Finland, France, Germany, Hong Kong, Ireland, Israel, Italy, Japan, Netherlands, New Zealand, Norway, Portugal, Singapore, Spain, Sweden, Switzerland, United Kingdom, and the United States. Following subsequent reviews, MSCI announced that Greece would be reclassified from emerging to developed market status, with the transition scheduled to take effect in May 2027.

=== FTSE Russell ===
World map showing the FTSE Russell 2026 equity country classification for Developed Markets and Emerging Markets.

FTSE Russell, another major index provider, uses a four-tiered equity country classification system: Developed, Advanced Emerging, Secondary Emerging, and Frontier. The classification process focuses on a country's political and market environment and is largely independent of gross national income (GNI) or economy size. FTSE Russell's criteria for developed market status include high income (as measured by the World Bank GNI per capita rating), a well-developed regulatory compliance, fair treatment of minority shareholders, openness to foreign ownership, ease of capital repatriation, and efficient custody and settlement systems.

FTSE Russell classifies 26 markets as Developed.

=== International Monetary Fund ===
World map of advanced economies based on the IMF World Economic Outlook for October 2025.

The International Monetary Fund (IMF) uses the term "advanced economies" to describe the most developed countries in its World Economic Outlook. As of April 2026, the IMF classified 43 economies as advanced. The classification is not based solely on income but also considers financial market maturity, technological capability, and other structural factors. The list includes major economies such as the United States, Japan, and Germany, as well as smaller, highly specialised economies like Singapore, Ireland, and New Zealand.

=== World Bank ===
Map of world economies based on the World Bank income classification for the 2027 fiscal year

The World Bank Group classifies countries into four income groups, such as low, lower-middle, upper-middle, and high-income, based on gross national income (GNI) per capita calculated using the Atlas method. For the 2027 fiscal year, the high-income threshold was set at a GNI per capita of $14,375 or more. As of 2026, the World Bank classified 87 countries and territories as high-income economies. The World Bank also includes an Organisation for Economic Co-operation and Development (OECD) subcategory within its high-income group.

=== Other index providers ===
Other index providers, such as S&P Dow Jones Indices and STOXX, also maintain their own classifications of developed markets. These classifications may differ slightly from those of MSCI and FTSE Russell. For instance, FTSE Russell and S&P Dow Jones Indices classify South Korea as a developed market, whereas MSCI has historically classified it as an emerging market, although this has been subject to review. In September 2027, S&P Dow Jones is scheduled to reclassify Poland from Emerging to Developed market status.

== Table ==
Country / Region	MSCI Developed Markets	FTSE Russell Developed Markets	S&P Dow Jones Indices Developed Markets	IMF Advanced Economy
Andorra	No	No	No	Yes
Australia	Yes	Yes	Yes	Yes
Austria	Yes	Yes	Yes	Yes
Belgium	Yes	Yes	Yes	Yes
Bulgaria	No	No	No	Yes
Canada	Yes	Yes	Yes	Yes
Croatia	No	No	No	Yes
Cyprus	No	No	No	Yes
Czech Republic	No	No	No	Yes
Denmark	Yes	Yes	Yes	Yes
Estonia	No	No	No	Yes
Finland	Yes	Yes	Yes	Yes
France	Yes	Yes	Yes	Yes
Germany	Yes	Yes	Yes	Yes
Greece	No (Note: Will be reclassified as a developed market in May 2027.)	Yes	Yes	Yes
Hong Kong	Yes	Yes	Yes	Yes
Iceland	No	No	No	Yes
Ireland	Yes	Yes	Yes	Yes
Israel	Yes	Yes	Yes	Yes
Italy	Yes	Yes	Yes	Yes
Japan	Yes	Yes	Yes	Yes
South Korea	No	Yes	Yes	Yes
Latvia	No	No	No	Yes
Liechtenstein	No	No	No	Yes
Lithuania	No	No	No	Yes
Luxembourg	No	Yes	Yes	Yes
Macau	No	No	No	Yes
Malta	No	No	No	Yes
Netherlands	Yes	Yes	Yes	Yes
New Zealand	Yes	Yes	Yes	Yes
Norway	Yes	Yes	Yes	Yes
Poland	No	Yes	No (Note: Will be reclassified as a developed market in September 2027.)	No
Portugal	Yes	Yes	Yes	Yes
Puerto Rico	No	No	No	Yes
San Marino	No	No	No	Yes
Singapore	Yes	Yes	Yes	Yes
Slovakia	No	No	No	Yes
Slovenia	No	No	No	Yes
Spain	Yes	Yes	Yes	Yes
Sweden	Yes	Yes	Yes	Yes
Switzerland	Yes	Yes	Yes	Yes
Taiwan	No	No	No	Yes
United Kingdom	Yes	Yes	Yes	Yes
United States	Yes	Yes	Yes	Yes

== See also ==
- Developed country
- Emerging market
- First World
- Frontier markets
- Global North and Global South
