= United States congressional committee =

Legislative working groups of the United States federal government

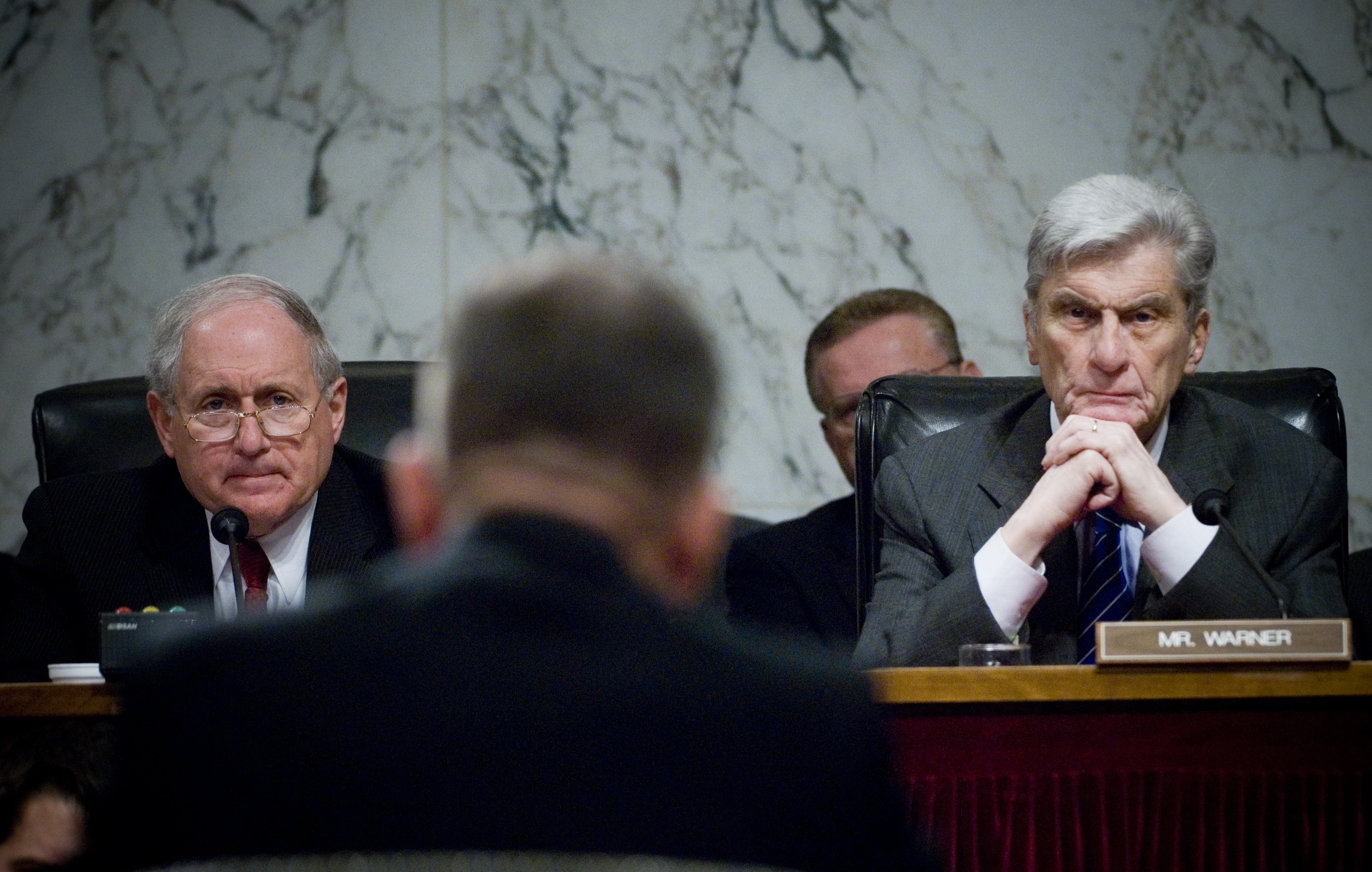
The Senate Armed Services Committee chairman Carl Levin and John Warner in 2007 hearing opening statements during a confirmation hearing for a position in the Department of Defense.

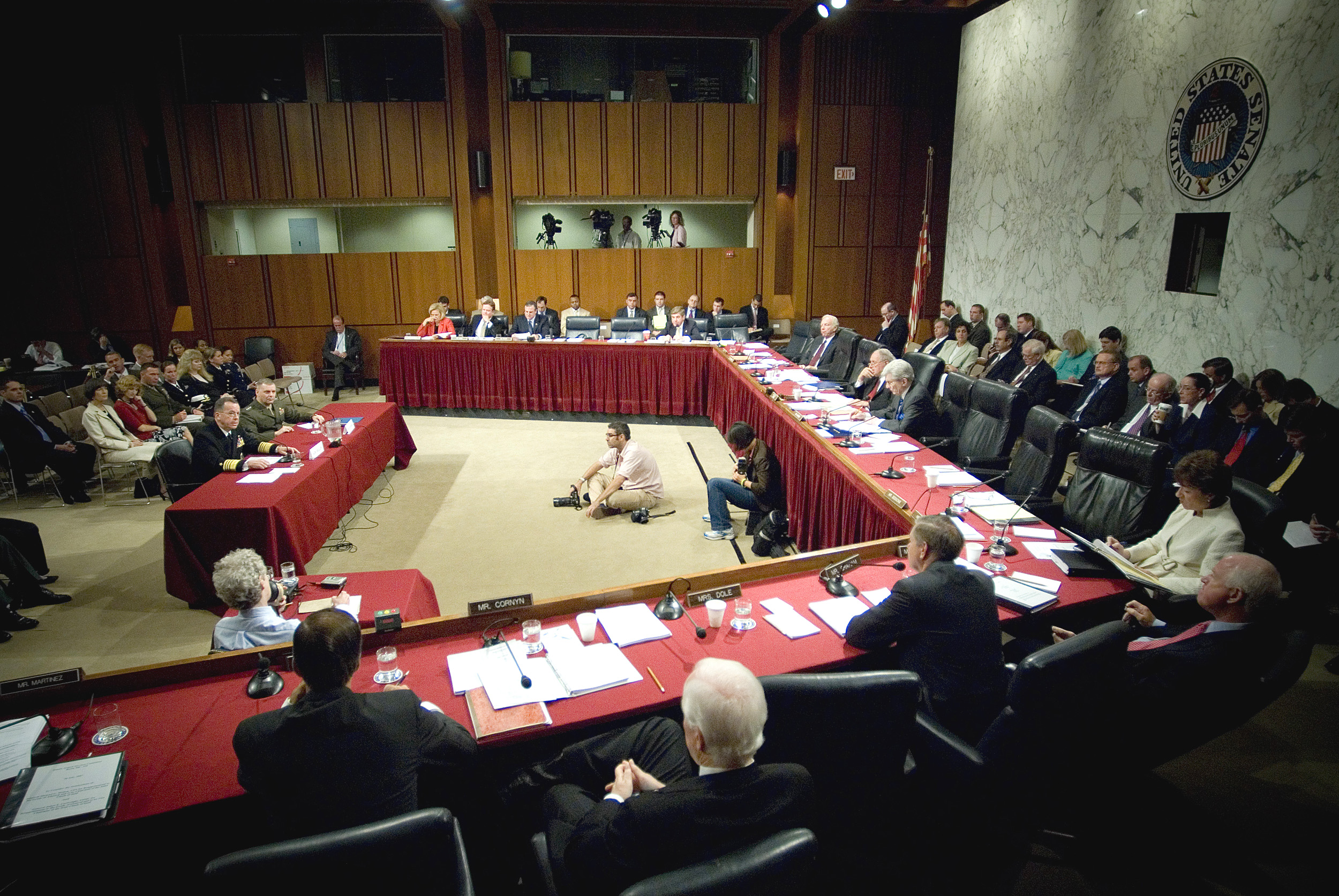
The Senate Armed Services Committee hearing testimony in the Hart Senate Office Building in 2007.

A congressional committee is a legislative sub-organization in the United States Congress that handles a specific duty (rather than the general duties of Congress). Committee membership enables members to develop specialized knowledge of the matters under their jurisdiction. As "little legislatures", the committees monitor ongoing governmental operations, identify issues suitable for legislative review, gather and evaluate information, and recommend courses of action to their parent body. Woodrow Wilson once wrote, "it is not far from the truth to say that Congress in session is Congress on public exhibition, whilst Congress in its committee rooms is Congress at work." It is not expected that a member of Congress be an expert on all matters and subject areas that come before Congress. Congressional committees provide valuable informational services to Congress by investigating and reporting about specialized subjects.

Congress divides its legislative, oversight, and internal administrative tasks among approximately 200 committees and subcommittees. Within assigned areas, these functional subunits gather information; compare and evaluate legislative alternatives; identify policy problems and propose solutions; select, determine, and report measures for full chamber consideration; monitor executive branch performance (oversight); and investigate allegations of wrongdoing. The investigatory functions have always been a key role. In the tabling and wording of new law, procedures such as the House discharge petition process (the process of bringing a bill onto the floor without a committee report or mandatory consent from its leadership) are so laborious and technical that committees, today, dominate the draftsmanship and honing of the detail of many bills laid before Congress. Of the 73 discharge petitions submitted to the full House from 1995 through 2007, only one was successful in securing a definitive yea-or-nay vote for a bill.

The growth in autonomy and overlap of committees has fragmented the power of the Senate and of the House. This dispersion of power may, at times, weaken the legislative branch relative to the other two branches of the federal government, the executive and the judiciary. In his often cited article History of the House of Representatives, written in 1961, American scholar George B. Galloway (1898–1967) wrote: "In practice, Congress functions not as a unified institution, but as a collection of semi-autonomous committees that seldom act in unison." Galloway went on to cite committee autonomy as a factor interfering with the adoption of a coherent legislative program. Such autonomy remains a characteristic feature of the committee system in Congress today.

== History ==
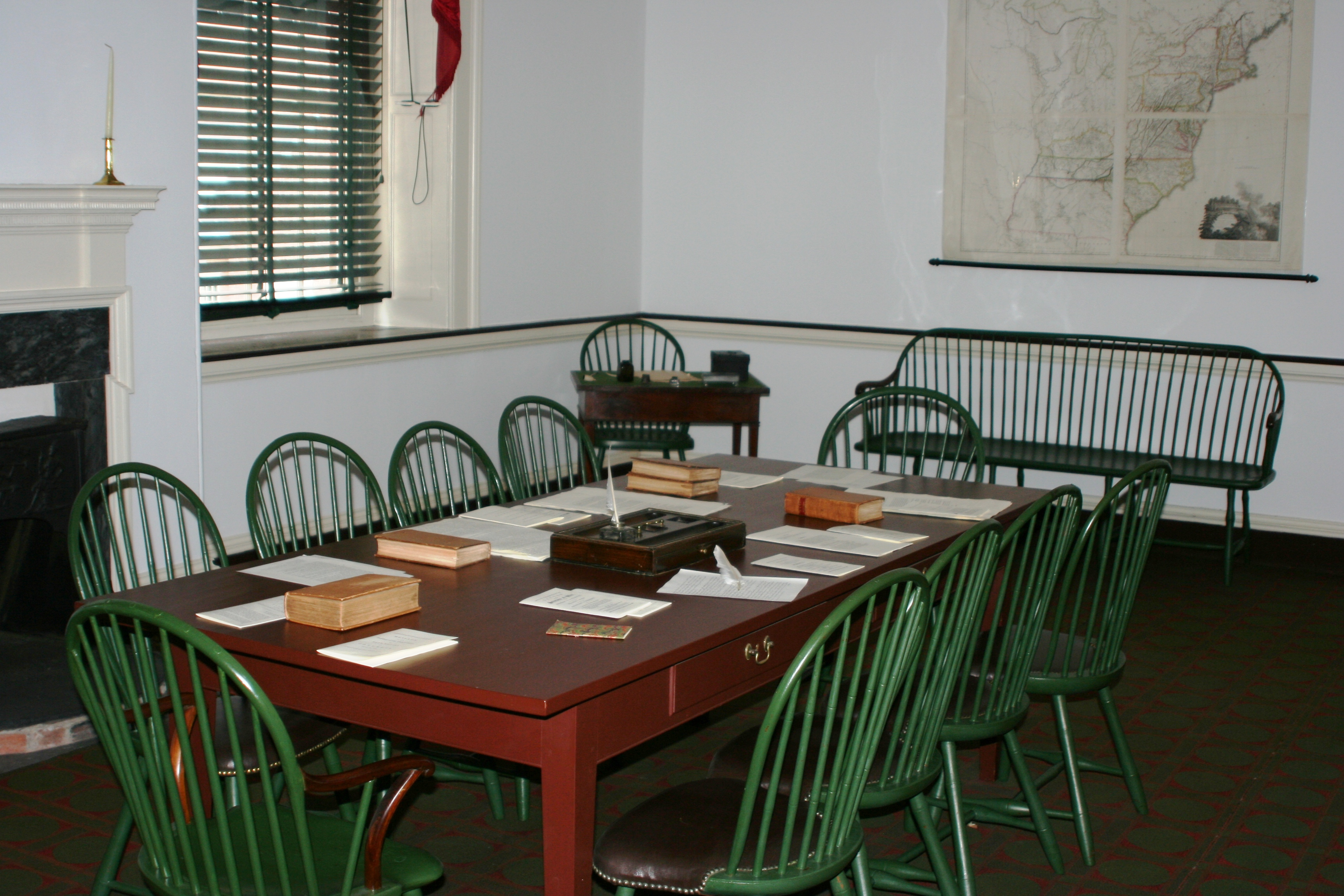
The second committee room upstairs in Congress Hall, Philadelphia, Pennsylvania.

In 1932, a reform movement temporarily reduced the number of signatures required on discharge petitions in the U.S. House of Representatives from a constitutional majority of 218 down to 145, i.e., from one-half to one-third of the House membership. This reform was abolished in a 1935 counterattack led by the intra-House oligarchy. Thus the era of the Great Depression marks the last across-the-board change, albeit a short-lived one, in the autonomy of House standing committees.

The modern committee structure stems from the Legislative Reorganization Act of 1946, the first and most ambitious restructuring of the standing committee system since the committee system was first developed. The 1946 act reduced the number of House committees from 48 to 19 and the number of Senate committees from 33 to 15. Jurisdictions of all committees were codified by rule in their respective chambers, which helped consolidate or eliminate many existing committees and minimize jurisdictional conflicts.

The Joint Committee on the Organization of Congress, a temporary committee established in 1993 to conduct a policy and historical analysis of the committee system, determined that while the 1946 Act was instrumental in streamlining the committee system, it did fail to limit the number of subcommittees allowed on any one committee. Today, Rules in the U.S. House of Representatives generally limit each full committee to five subcommittees, with the exception of Appropriations (12 subcommittees), Armed Services (7), Foreign Affairs (7), and Transportation and Infrastructure (6). There are no limits on the number of subcommittees in the U.S. Senate.

Congress has convened several other temporary review committees to analyze and make recommendations on ways to reform and improve the committee system. For example, the Legislative Reorganization Act of 1970 led to further reforms to open Congress to further public visibility, strengthen its decision-making capacities, and augment minority rights. The 1970 Act provided for recorded teller votes in the House's Committee of the Whole; allowed minority party committee members to call their own witnesses during a day of hearings; established the Senate Committee on Veterans' Affairs; and enhanced the research capabilities of two legislative support agencies: the Congressional Research Service and the General Accounting Office.

Between 1994 and 2014, overall committee staffing was reduced by 35 percent. The number of hearings held in the House declined from 6,000 hearings per year in the 1970s, to about 4,000 hearings in 1994, and to just over 2,000 hearings in 2014. Commentators from both major parties have expressed concern regarding the loss of committee capacity to research and develop legislative initiatives.

=== Senate committees ===
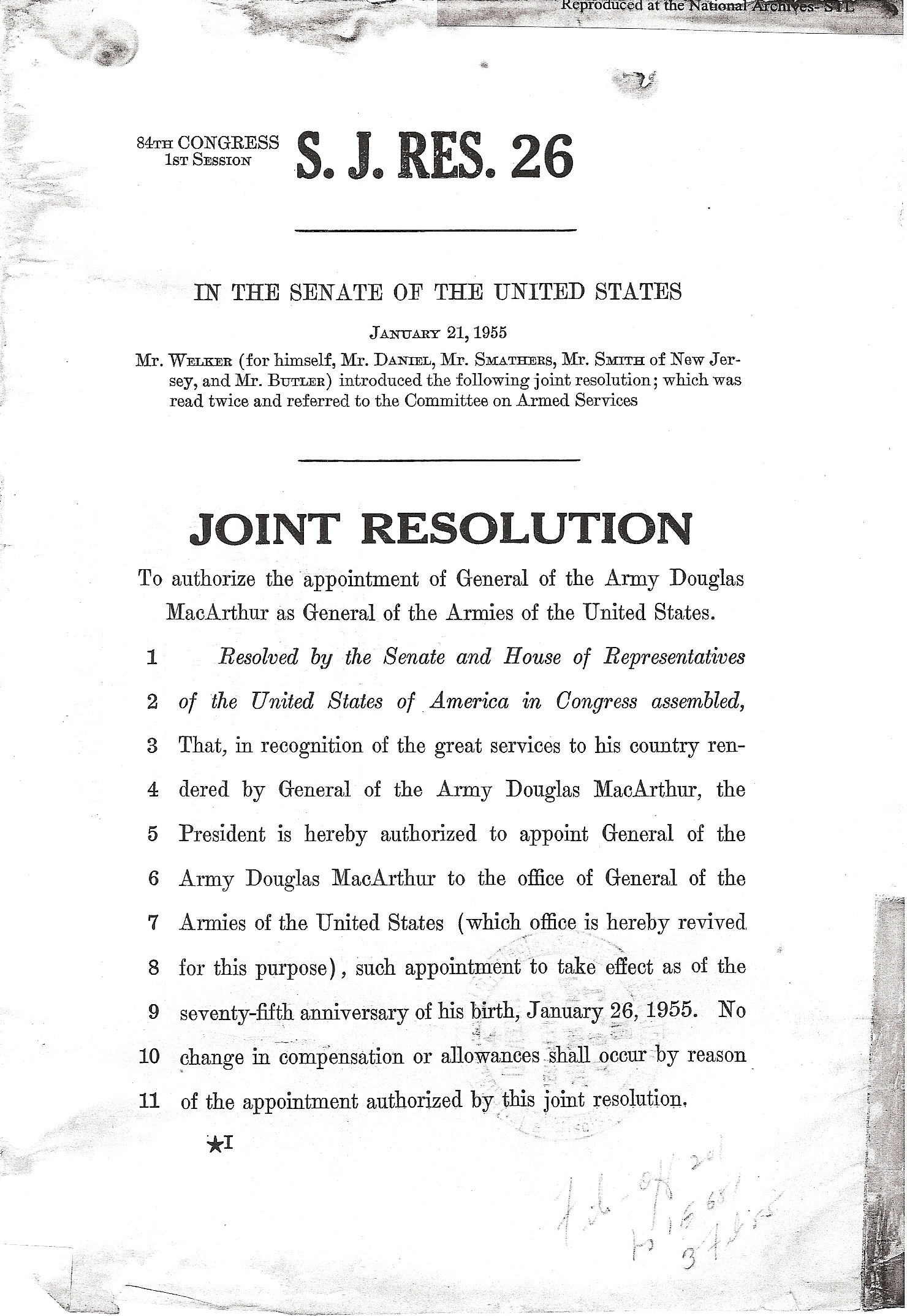
After committee deliberation, the Senate passed a joint resolution in 1955 authorizing Army General Douglas MacArthur to the post of General of the Armies of the United States.

The first Senate committee was established April 7, 1789, to draw up Senate rules of procedure. In those early days, the Senate operated with temporary select committees, which were responsive to the entire Senate, with the full Senate selecting their jurisdiction and membership. This system provided a great deal of flexibility, as if one committee proved unresponsive, another could be established in its place. The Senate could also forgo committee referral for actions on legislation or presidential nominations. These early committees generally consisted of three members for routine business and five members for more important issues. The largest committee established during the 1st Congress had eleven members, and was created to determine salaries of the president and vice president. Also in the first session, the entire membership of the Senate was divided into two large committees, with half the senators on the committee to prepare legislation establishing the federal judiciary and the other half on the committee to define the punishment of crimes against the United States.

This system proved ineffective, so in 1816 the Senate adopted a formal system of 11 standing committees with five members each. Three of those committees, the Finance, Foreign Relations and the Judiciary Committees exist largely unchanged today, while the duties of the others have evolved into successor committees. With the advent of this new system, committees are able to handle long-term studies and investigations, in addition to regular legislative duties. According to the Senate Historical Office, "the significance of the change from temporary to permanent committees was perhaps little realized at the time." With the growing responsibilities of the Senate, the committees gradually grew to be the key policy-making bodies of the Senate, instead of merely technical aids to the chamber.

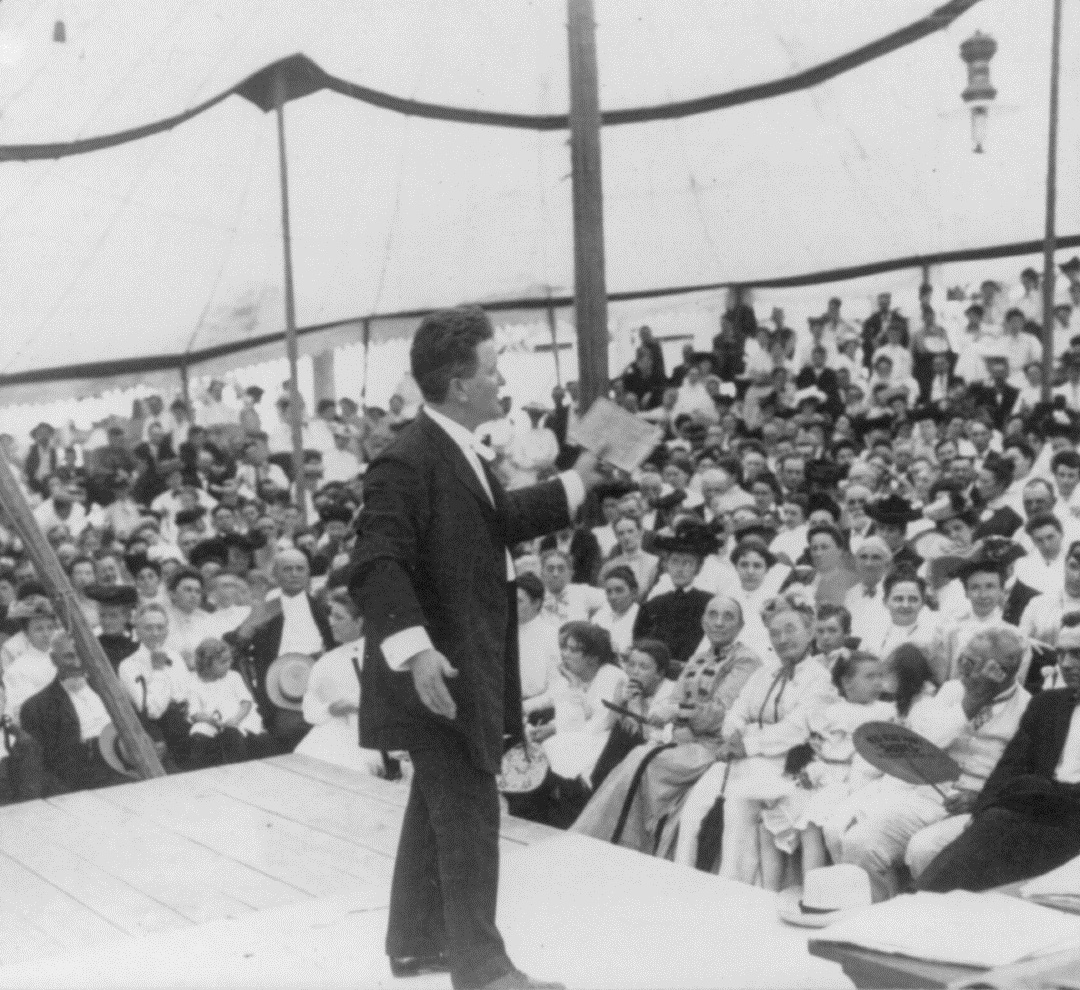
Governor La Follette of Wisconsin addressing the Chautauqua assembly in Decatur, Illinois in 1905.

By 1906, the Senate maintained 66 standing and select committees—eight more committees than members of the majority party. The large number of committees and the manner of assigning their chairmanships suggests that many of them existed solely to provide office space in those days before the Senate acquired its first permanent office building, the Russell Senate Office Building. There were so many committees that freshman Senator Robert La Follette of Wisconsin was assigned chairmanship of the Committee to Investigate the Condition of the Potomac River Front at Washington. According to La Follette, he "had immediate visions of cleaning up the whole Potomac River front. Then [he] found that in all its history, the committee had never had a bill referred to it for consideration, and had never held a meeting." In 1920, the Congressional Directory listed nearly 80 committees, including the Committee on the Disposition of Useless Papers in the Executive Departments. By May 27, 1920, the Russell Senate Office Building had opened, and with all Senate members assigned private office space, the Senate quietly abolished 42 committees.

Today the Senate operates with 21 committees (16 standing and 5 select). These select committees, however, are permanent in nature and are treated as standing committees under Senate rules.

=== House committees ===
The first House committee was appointed on April 2, 1789, to "prepare and report such standing rules and orders of proceeding" as well as the duties of a Sergeant-at-Arms to enforce those rules. Other committees were created as needed, on a temporary basis, to review specific issues for the full House. The House relied primarily on the Committee of the Whole to handle the bulk of legislative issues. In response to the House's need for more detailed advice on certain issues, more specific committees with broader authority were established. One of the first—a three-member committee "to prepare and report an estimate of supplies ... and of nett [sic] produce of the impost"—was established on April 29, 1789. The Committee on Ways and Means followed on July 24, 1789, during a debate on the creation of the Treasury Department over concerns of giving the new department too much authority over revenue proposals. The House felt it would be better equipped if it established a committee to handle the matter. This first Committee on Ways and Means had 11 members and existed for just two months. It later became a standing committee in 1801, a position it still holds today.

=== Committee assignment procedure ===
The appointment of Senate committee members is formally made by the whole Senate, and the whole House formally appoints House committee members, but the choice of members is actually made by the political parties. Generally, each party honors the preferences of individual members, giving priority on the basis of seniority.

In the Senate, each party is allocated seats on committees generally in proportion to its overall strength in the Senate as a whole. Membership on most House committees are also in rough proportion to the party's strength in the House as a whole, with two major exceptions: on the House Rules Committee, the majority party fills nine of the thirteen seats; and on the House Ethics Committee, each party has an equal number of seats.

In each committee, a member of the majority party serves as its chairperson, while a member of the minority party serves as its ranking member. Four Senate committees instead refer to the ranking minority member as vice chairperson: the Senate Committee on Appropriations, the Senate Committee on Indian Affairs, the Senate Select Committee on Ethics, and the Senate Select Committee on Intelligence. The chairpersons and ranking members in each committee are also elected by the political parties.

An analysis of U.S. House of Representative committee request letters from the 92nd, 93rd, 97th, 98th, 100th, and 101st Congresses showed that the most common justifications raised by members seeking a committee assignment were prior professional experience, geography, and electoral considerations, in that order. About 80 percent of justifications in the letters fell into one of these three categories. Members who request an assignment to the House Armed Services Committee tend to have a greater military presence in their district, while members requesting assignment to the House Interior Committee generally tend to come from sparsely populated areas with more land held in public trust.

== Types of committees ==
There are three main types of committees—standing, select or special, and joint.

=== Standing committees ===
Standing committees are permanent panels identified as such in chamber rules (House Rule X, Senate Rule XXV).

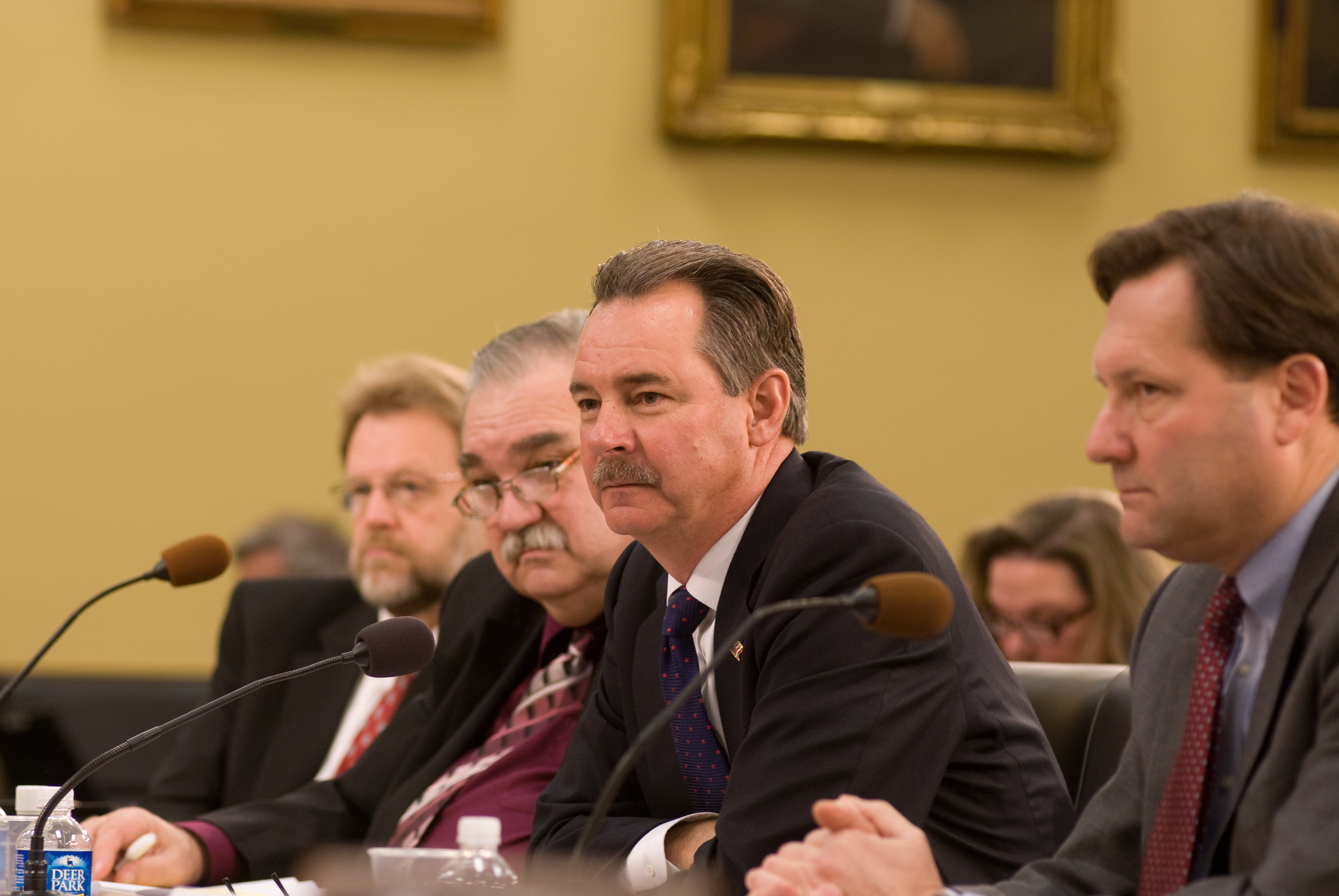
The House Appropriations Committee is a standing committee and meets regularly. In this instance, Federal Emergency Management Agency (FEMA) administrator R. David Paulson was answering questions before the committee about the 2009 budget.

Because they have legislative jurisdiction, standing committees consider bills and issues and recommend measures for consideration by their respective chambers. They also have oversight responsibility to monitor agencies, programs, and activities within their jurisdictions, and in some cases in areas that cut across committee jurisdictions.

Most standing committees recommend funding levels—authorizations—for government operations and for new and existing programs. A few have other functions. For example, the Appropriations Committees recommend appropriations legislation to provide budget authority for federal agencies and programs. The Budget Committees establish aggregate levels for total spending and revenue that serve as guidelines for the work of the authorizing and appropriating panels.

=== Select or special committees ===
Select or special committees are established generally by a separate resolution of the chamber, sometimes to conduct investigations and studies, and, on other occasions, also to consider measures. Often, select committees examine emerging issues that do not fit clearly within existing standing committee jurisdictions, or that cut across jurisdictional boundaries. A select committee may be permanent or temporary (all current select committees in the House and Senate are considered permanent committees). Instead of select, the Senate sometimes uses the term special committee (as in the Special Committee on Aging).

=== Joint committees ===
Joint committees are permanent panels that include members from both chambers, which generally conduct studies or perform housekeeping tasks rather than consider measures. For instance, the Joint Committee on Printing oversees the functions of the Government Printing Office and general printing procedures of the federal government. The chairmanship of joint committees usually alternates between the House and Senate.

As of June 17, 2017, there were four joint committees: the Economic, Library, Printing, and Taxation committees.

A conference committee is an ad hoc joint committee formed to resolve differences between similar but competing House and Senate versions of a bill. Conference committees draft compromises between the positions of the two chambers, which are then submitted to the full House and Senate for approval.

Apart from conference committees, most joint committees are permanent. But temporary joint committees have been created to address specific issues (such as the Joint Committee on the Conduct of the War during the American Civil War, and a Joint Committee on Inaugural Ceremonies to manage presidential and vice-presidential inaugurations).

=== Other ===
Other committees are also used in the modern Congress.

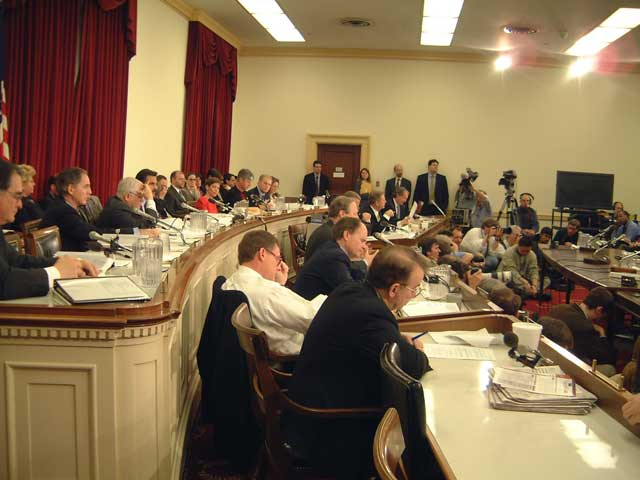
This subcommittee on Oversight and Investigations works under the direction of the Energy and Commerce committees of the House, and met in January 2002.

- Subcommittees are formed by most committees to share specific tasks within the jurisdiction of the full committee. Subcommittees are responsible to, and work within the guidelines established by, their parent committees. In particular, standing committees usually create subcommittees with legislative jurisdiction to consider and report bills. They may assign their subcommittees such specific tasks as the initial consideration of measures and oversight of laws and programs in the subcommittees' areas.
- Committee of the Whole—used by the House of Representatives, but not the modern Senate

== Current committees ==
In the House of Representatives, there are 22 permanent committees, and 20 in the United States Senate. Four joint committees operate with members from both houses on matters of mutual jurisdiction and oversight.

Committees in the House of Representatives generally have more members, due to its larger size, as compared to the smaller 100-member Senate. Senate rules fix the maximum size for many of its committees, while the House determines the size and makeup of each committee every new Congress.

House of Representatives	Senate	Joint
Agriculture; Appropriations; Armed Services; Budget; Education and Workforce; Energy and Commerce; Ethics; Financial Services; Foreign Affairs; Homeland Security; House Administration; Judiciary; Natural Resources; Oversight and Government Reform; Rules; Science, Space, and Technology; Small Business; Transportation and Infrastructure; Veterans' Affairs; Ways and Means; Intelligence (Permanent Select); Strategic Competition between the United States and the Chinese Communist Party (Select); (Whole)	Agriculture, Nutrition, and Forestry; Appropriations; Armed Services; Banking, Housing, and Urban Affairs; Budget; Commerce, Science, and Transportation; Energy and Natural Resources; Environment and Public Works; Finance; Foreign Relations; Health, Education, Labor, and Pensions; Homeland Security and Governmental Affairs; Indian Affairs; Judiciary; Rules and Administration; Small Business and Entrepreneurship; Veterans' Affairs; Aging (Special); Intelligence (Select); International Narcotics Control (Special)	(Conference) (ad hoc, resolves disagreement to a bill); Economic; Library; Printing; Taxation

== See also ==
- Discharge petition
- Regular order (United States Congress)
