= Civil Service Retirement System =

U.S. public pension fund

The Civil Service Retirement System (CSRS) is a public pension fund organized in 1920 that has provided retirement, disability, and survivor benefits for most civilian employees in the United States federal government. Upon the creation of a new Federal Employees Retirement System (FERS) in 1987, those newly hired after that date cannot participate in CSRS. CSRS continues to provide retirement benefits to those eligible to receive them.

CSRS is a defined-benefit plan, akin to a pension. Notably, though, CSRS employees do not participate in Social Security (unless having worked in the private sector beforehand, and then subject to penalties).

Employees hired after 1983 are required to be covered by the Federal Employees Retirement System (FERS), which is a three tiered retirement system with a smaller defined benefit (pension), Social Security, and a 401(k)-style system called the Thrift Savings Plan (TSP). The defined benefits of both the CSRS and the FERS systems are paid out of the Civil Service Retirement and Disability Fund, which had a projected balance of $898 billion as of September 30, 2017.

With changes in the determining retirement coverage of federal employees under FERS or CSRS, those employees who are later rehired that were previously covered under CSRS will retain their CSRS coverage if they meet certain service rules. In general, if rehired employees have 5 years of civilian service as of December 31, 1986, they will retain CSRS coverage. However, if the break in service is greater than 365 days, the employee is also covered under Social Security and will be deemed CSRS Offset. Overall benefits paid to CSRS or CSRS Offset employees will remain equitable based on the number of years of creditable service and CSRS formula upon retirement. CSRS and CSRS Offset employees with a break in service more than three days are also eligible to elect coverage under FERS within the first six months of rehire.

Employees who were previously covered under CSRS and do not meet the 5 year retirement coverage rule are automatically covered under the FERS upon rehire.

Employees under CSRS (and CSRS Offset) may contribute to TSP as well, but participate as a supplement to their designated pension benefit. Contributions to the TSP are not matched.

The fund was utilized as an extraordinary measure in 2015 and also in the 2023 United States debt-ceiling crisis by Janet Yellen, the Secretary of the U. S. Treasury to deal with scarcities in federal funds caused by prolonged congressional debates over raising the national debt ceiling.
