= Federal Employees Retirement System =

Retirement system for employees within the United States civil service

The Federal Employees' Retirement System (FERS) is the retirement system for employees within the United States civil service. FERS became effective January 1, 1987, to replace the Civil Service Retirement System (CSRS) and to conform federal retirement plans in line with those in the private sector.

FERS consists of three major components:

- The FERS annuity, a defined benefit plan,
- Mandatory participation in Social Security (most CSRS employees are not part of Social Security and do not pay taxes into the system, nor are they eligible for benefits unless they qualify under private sector employment or by being rehired and covered as CSRS with a Social Security Offset), and
- The Thrift Savings Plan (TSP), a defined contribution plan which operates like a 401(k).

== Transition from CSRS to FERS ==
Since January 1, 1984, employees with fewer than 5 years of non-military experience on December 31, 1986, were covered under interim retirement rules under which they were covered by both CSRS and the Social Security system (commonly referred to as CSRS Offset). They made reduced payments to the CSRS (1.3 percent of earnings instead of the usual 7 percent) and contributed their full employee share to Social Security. Employees with more than 5 years of non-military service on December 31, 1986, continued under the dual benefit coverage unless they opted to switch to FERS between July 1, 1986, and December 31, 1987. Employees covered only by CSRS remained covered by it unless they opted to switch to FERS. Once an employee elected to switch to FERS the choice was irrevocable.

== FERS annuity ==
=== Eligibility ===
Most new federal employees hired on or after January 1, 1987, are automatically covered under FERS. Those newly hired and certain employees rehired between January 1, 1984, and December 31, 1986, were automatically converted to coverage under FERS on January 1, 1987; the portion of time under the old system is referred to as "CSRS Offset" and only that portion falls under the CSRS rules. Rehired federal employees who worked prior to December 31, 1983, and had 5 years of civilian service by December 31, 1986, can choose between remaining in CSRS or electing FERS within six months of rehire, but should the employee elect to switch from CSRS to FERS coverage, the election is irrevocable. Employees of Nonappropriated Fund Instrumentalities of the Departments of Defense and Homeland Security participate in a separate retirement system, except when retaining previous coverage under a different retirement system following a transfer.

=== Contributions ===
Employees hired prior to January 1, 2013 contribute 0.8 percent of salaries to their FERS annuity (post-tax, unlike TSP contributions which are pre-tax), while employees hired in 2013 contribute 3.1 percent and employees hired in 2014 and thereafter contribute 4.4 percent (an additional 0.5 percent applies to certain special category positions, regardless of when hired); this percentage does not change so long as the employee remains in Federal service. The government matching portion is dependent on the employee's job classification and is based on actuarial assumptions, and is subject to change.

Unlike TSP, where an employee can choose not to participate and thus not have any withdrawals from salary, FERS contributions are mandatory. However, at retirement or separation from Federal service, one may ask for a refund of contributions made; only employee contributions (this includes deposits and redeposit for creditable military service and civilian service where no FERS annuity contributions were made) are refunded (with interest; the interest portion is taxable income unless rolled over into an IRA), government matching contributions are not refunded and are lost. However, a spouse or former spouse must be notified, and a refund will not be allowed if it would end a court-ordered right for a spouse or former spouse to obtain benefits from the employee's Federal service. And if the employee returns to Federal service, a refund voids entitlement to an annuity based on the former service unless repaid upon return.

=== Retirement qualifications for annuity ===
In order to qualify for the standard FERS annuity an employee must have reached a minimum retirement age (MRA) and have a specified number of years of "creditable Federal service". Credit for certain levels of military service (as well as some part-time employment prior to 1989) may be repurchased for a specified percentage of prior salary plus accrued interest; such repurchase is optional and can be made at any time prior to retirement (but not after retirement). Part-time work is counted on a pro-rated basis (e.g. a person working one year, part-time for 40 hours of a regular 80-hour pay period, is credited with half a year of service). Any leave without pay days (e.g. days when an employee was furloughed and not later repaid, or who was on unpaid leave due to a serious medical condition) are counted as if having worked, limited to six months in a year.

The MRA is based on the employee's birth year as shown on the table below:

Birth year	MRA
1947 or earlier	55 years
1948	55 years, 2 months
1949	55 years, 4 months
1950	55 years, 6 months
1951	55 years, 8 months
1952	55 years, 10 months
1953–1964	56 years
1965	56 years, 2 months
1966	56 years, 4 months
1967	56 years, 6 months
1968	56 years, 8 months
1969	56 years, 10 months
1970 or after	57 years

==== Immediate and deferred retirement ====
For an immediate retirement (which starts the first day of the first full month after the employee separates from service) or a deferred retirement (which starts on a date of the employee's choosing) the employee must meet one of the following combinations of age and years of actual creditable service:

- Age 62 with 5 years,
- Age 60 with 20 years (but an employee retiring under this criterion is not eligible for deferred retirement),
- At least the MRA with 30 years, or
- At least the MRA with 10 years (but for employees under age 62 with less than 30 years, the benefit is permanently reduced by 5/12 of one percent for each month the employee is under age 62, unless the employee has at least 20 years' service and agrees to defer the annuity until age 62 or older).

==== Other retirement options ====
Employees facing either involuntary separation (for reasons other than misconduct), or voluntary separation in lieu of a "reduction in force" (similar to a layoff) can, in some cases, qualify for early retirement. The employee must either be age 50 with 20 years of actual creditable service, or have 25 years of actual creditable service at any age (the MRA does not apply in this case).

Disability retirement is also a potential option for eligible federal employees with at least 18 months of service who no longer can perform their duties. The following conditions are required:

- the employee must have become disabled, while employed in a position subject to FERS, because of a disease or injury, for useful and efficient service in the employee's current position,
- the disability must be expected to last at least one year, and
- the agency must certify that it is unable to accommodate the disabling medical condition in the employee's present position and that it has considered the employee for any vacant position in the same agency at the same grade/pay level, within the same commuting area, for which the employee is qualified for reassignment. If disability retirement is not approved by OPM, it can be appealed through reconsideration.

=== Annuity calculation ===
The FERS annuity is based on a specified percentage (either 1% or 1.1% for most employees, see below), multiplied by (a) the length of an employee's Federal service eligible for FERS retirement (referred to as "creditable Federal service", which may not be the actual duration of Federal employment) and (b) the average annual rate of basic pay of the employee's highest-paid consecutive 36 months (three years) of service (commonly referred to as the "high-3" period).

The "high-3" pay includes all items for which retirement deductions are withheld; this includes basic pay, locality pay adjustments and shift differentials, but not overtime (except in special circumstances mainly involving first responders), bonuses/awards, severance pay or buyouts, payments for unused annual leave and credit hours, or "hazard pay" (additional pay for certain "hazardous" duty assignments, such as working in a combat zone). All salaries earned during the "high-3" period are time-weighted, and include COLAs, within-grade (step) increases, and promotions. The "high-3" period normally is the final three years of service but does not have to be (e.g. an employee taking a voluntary downgrade to avoid a reduction-in-force (RIF) could have a high-3 period in an earlier time frame).

The FERS annuity is structured to provide employees an incentive to continue working for at least 20 years in Federal service and until age 62 (which is also the earliest age at which a FERS employee can collect Social Security benefits), since employees retiring at or after age 62 with 20 years of service or more have the annuity calculated at 1.1 percent of the high-3 average times the number of years worked (including fractional years using months but not days), while employees not meeting those criteria have the annuity calculated at 1 percent of such. Separate calculations exist for certain workers (mainly Members of Congress or congressional staff, law enforcement officers, firefighters and air traffic control specialists) and for employees who transferred from CSRS to FERS. An employee retiring under age 62 will receive a "special retirement supplement" which duplicates what an employee would earn under Social Security at age 62, but at age 62 the supplement ends. Disability retirement annuity payments are offset totally by any Social Security disability payments for the first 12 months, and then partially afterwards until age 62; at that time the annuity is treated as if the employee had worked for the entire period of disability (but at the same grade and step, with no within-grade increases or career ladder promotions taken into account), and the "high-3" and resulting annuity is recalculated taking into account any COLA's that would have been earned between the original retirement and age 62.

Unused sick leave is converted, at 100% of the balance for employees retiring in 2015 and after, to additional creditable service based on a conversion table, where 2,087 hours equals one full year of additional creditable service. The leave can only increase the amount of creditable service for annuity purposes; it cannot be used to create an eligibility which did not exist (e.g. to either make an otherwise ineligible person eligible for retirement).

- For example, a person born in 1965, age 56 years and two months, with 29 years and 10 months' actual creditable service, plus sick leave hours which equate to four months of creditable time, would not be eligible for retirement (even though, for annuity calculation purposes, s/he would be credited with 30 years and two months of creditable service), because although s/he has reached the MRA s/he lacks the actual creditable service required to retire.

The actual calculation of creditable service adds years, months, and days separately for civilian employment, military employment repurchased, and unused sick leave.

- For example, an employee with 33 years, 11 months, and 17 days of actual service time, plus four months and 20 days of unused sick leave, will be calculated as having 33 years, 15 months, and 37 days of time.
- The days are then converted to months at a rate of 30 days = one month, with any excess days lost (in this case, the 37 days will convert 30 days to one month, with the remaining seven days lost, leaving the employee with 33 years and 16 months).
- The months are then converted to years at a rate of 12 months = one year, with the remaining months shown as a fraction (in this case, the 16 months will convert 12 months to one year, leaving the employee with 34 years and four months, or 34 4/12 years for annuity calculation purposes).

No other types of earned leave are factored into the annuity calculation. Unused annual leave hours are "cashed out" (paid to the employee, at his/her rate of pay as if the employee remained on the payroll until the leave was fully used; in the event of an intervening COLA leave remaining after its effective date will be paid at the new rate). Where applicable, earned but unused credit hours are also cashed out upon retirement at the same rate as annual leave. Other types of unused leave (such as compensatory time off for travel outside normal duty hours, and time off awards given in lieu of cash) are not paid and are thus lost if not used before retirement.

Generally, an employee has the right to determine his/her "date of final separation" (i.e. the last day on the payroll; it does not have to be the final working day in a pay period); the following day is the employee's retirement date. The annuity does not begin until one full calendar month has passed since the employee's retirement. Thus, an employee retiring on June 30 will have his/her annuity begin on August 1 (as the employee will be retired beginning July 1 and for the entire month of July), but an employee retiring on July 1 will not have his/her annuity begin until September 1 (as the employee will be retired beginning July 2 but not for the entire month of July, only in the following month—August—will the employee be retired for an entire month). Per the Comptroller General in a 1945 decision, employees cannot be on "terminal leave" through the date of retirement (except in extenuating circumstances); this is often avoided by the employee being allowed to use up desired leave, but then coming into work on his/her final work day for out-processing tasks (turn in of badge and computer equipment, etc.)

Married employees will have their annuity reduced by a survivor benefit unless the spouse specifically in writing consents to receiving less than a full benefit; the reduction is based on the survivor benefit chosen.

Employees are eligible for a COLA if they meet certain criteria. The most notable is retirement after age 62; most employees who retire before age 62 will not receive a COLA (on either their annuity or their special retirement supplement) until age 62 (however, certain categories of employees, mainly those who are required to retire early based on their occupation or who retire on disability, will receive a COLA before age 62).

Because employee contributions are post-tax, a portion of any FERS annuity received is not taxable. However, the non-tax portion is relatively small (since the majority of the annuity contributions are paid by the government); and even though the non-tax portion would be paid back within a few months after retirement, tax law requires it to be spread out over a period of years depending on the annuitant's (and his/her spouse's) age (but in the event the annuitant dies before it is repaid, the unpaid balance is paid as shown below).

=== Payment at death ===
If an employee or retiree dies and a survivor benefit was not chosen, then any unpaid balance of employee contributions (but not government matching contributions) is paid to the designated beneficiary or beneficiaries .

If the employee or retiree did not designate any beneficiaries, then the "statutory order of precedence" is used, as follows:

- To the widow or widower,
- To any surviving children (in equal shares) or their descendants,
- To any surviving parent or parents,
- To the court-appointed executor or administrator of the estate,
- To the next of kin as determined by the laws of the state where the employee or retiree lived at death.

== FERCCA Legislation ==
The Federal Erroneous Retirement Coverage Corrections Act (FERCCA) legislation was signed in September 2000. It was designed to provide relief to federal civilian employees who were placed in the wrong retirement system for at least three years of service after December 31, 1986.

FERCCA gave affected employees and annuitants placed in the wrong retirement system an opportunity to choose between the Federal Employees' Retirement System (FERS) and the offset provisions of CSRS. FERCCA may also provide one or more of the following:

- Reimbursement for certain out-of-pocket expenses paid as a result of a coverage error,
- Ability to benefit from certain changes in the rules about how some government service counts toward retirement, and
- Make-up contributions to the Thrift Savings Plan and receipt of lost earnings on those contributions
