= Stabilization Fund of the Russian Federation =

Russian sovereign wealth fund (2004–2008)

The Stabilization fund of the Russian Federation (SFRF, Russian: Стабилизационный фонд Российской Федерации, romanized: Stabilizatsionny fond Rossiyskoy Federatsi) was a sovereign wealth fund established based on a resolution of the Government of Russia on 1 January 2004, as a part of the federal budget to balance the federal budget at the time of when oil price falls below a cut-off price, currently set at US$27 per barrel.

The rainy-day Stabilization Fund was used to buffer the national budget, which is strongly tied to the price of crude oil.

The Fund was created to create a reserve of liquidity with the additional benefit of reducing inflationary pressure and insulating the economy of Russia from volatility of raw material export earnings (for example the price of crude oil), which was among the reasons of the 1998 Russian financial crisis.

In February 2008 the SFRF was split into a "Reserve Fund", which was invested abroad in low-yield securities and used when oil and gas incomes fall, and the "National Welfare Fund", which invests in riskier, higher-return vehicles, as well as federal budget expenditures. The Reserve Fund was given $125 billion and the National Welfare Fund was given $32 billion.

By 2017 the Reserve Fund was exhausted and ceased to exist.

Aggregate amount of the SFRF
Date	in Billion US dollars	in Billion rubles
01.30.2008	157	3,852
01.01.2008	156.81	3,849.11
01.12.2007	144.43	3,517.05
01.11.2007	147.60	3,649.25
01.10.2007	141.05	3,519.09
01.09.2007	132.91	3,409.07
01.08.2007	127.48	3,263.56
01.07.2007	121.68	3,141.35
01.06.2007	116.85	3,026.68
01.05.2007	113.70	2,920.50
01.04.2007	108.11	2,812.21
01.03.2007	103.55	2,708.85
01.02.2007	99.77	2,647.21
01.01.2007	89.13	2,346.92
01.12.2006	83.21	2,189.52
01.11.2006	76.62	2,049.30
01.10.2006	70.73	1,894.09
01.09.2006	64.73	1,730.64
01.08.2006	82.14	2,207.33

== History ==
According to amendments to Russia's budget code inspired by President Vladimir Putin's budget address of March 2007 and passed in April 2007, in February 2008 the Stabilization Fund was supposed to be split into a Reserve Fund, to be invested abroad in low-yield securities and used when oil and gas incomes fall, and a Future Generations' Fund (later renamed the National Wealth Fund), which will invest in riskier, higher return vehicles, as well as federal budget expenditures. Unlike the Stabilization Fund, the new funds will also accumulate revenues from oil products and natural gas.

On 21 May 2007, President Vladimir Putin urged the government to pump surplus oil revenue into domestic stocks by buying Russian blue chips such as Gazprom and Rosneft, which had fallen since the beginning of the year, instead of foreign securities, which previously had been explicitly forbidden due to fear of inflation.

The SFRF had trouble during the Great Recession in Russia.

== Accumulation and expenditure ==
The Fund accumulated revenues from the export duty for oil and the tax on oil mining operations when the price for Urals oil exceeds the set cut-off price.

The capital of the Fund was to be used to cover the federal budget deficit and for other purposes, if its balance exceeds 500 billion rubles, spending amounts are subject to the federal budget law for the corresponding fiscal year.

As the capital of the Fund had exceeded the level of 500 billion rubles in 2005, part of its surplus was used for early foreign debt repayments as well as to cover Russian Pension Fund's deficit. The details of these transactions in 2005 are as follows:

Transactions in 2005	billion USD
Early debt repayment to the International Monetary Fund	3.33
First debt repayment installment to the countries-members of the Paris Club	15
Paid to Vnesheconombank (VEB) for loans provided to the Ministry of Finance in 1998-1999 for servicing the state foreign debt of Russian Federation	4.3
Transferred to the Russian Pension Fund.	1.04

== Investment Policy ==
=== Governance Structure ===
The Fund was managed by the Russian Ministry of Finance, in accordance with the procedure defined by the Government of the Russian Federation. Some functions of asset management may be delegated to the Central Bank of the Russian Federation ("the Bank of Russia"), based on its agreement with the Government.

Concerning the Fund's objectives, its capital was to be invested in foreign sovereign debt securities. Securities' eligibility criteria are subject to the Government's approval.

The Ministry of Finance was empowered by the Government to establish the Fund's currency composition and its strategic asset allocation in line with the investment policy for the Fund's management.

The Ministry of Finance could use one or both of the following schemes defined by the Government to invest the Fund's capital.

Schemes defined by the Government to invest the Fund's capital
Investment in eligible foreign fixed income securities directly
Allocation to the Federal Treasury's accounts with the Bank of Russia in foreign currency, with the total return of these accounts based on indices composed of eligible foreign debt securities and defined by the Ministry of Finance.

The Fund assets were invested solely under second scheme (allocation to the Federal Treasury's accounts with the Bank of Russia).

=== Investment Guidelines ===
The Government determined that eligible debt securities for the Fund investment were to correspond to the following requirements.

Fixed income securities of Austria, Belgium, Finland, France, Germany, Greece, Ireland, Italy, Luxembourg, Netherlands, Portugal, Spain, the United Kingdom, and the United States, denominated in US dollars, euro, pounds sterling (sovereign debt securities)
Issuer shall have a long-term credit rating at AAA/Aaa level (highest investment grade) from at least two of the following three rating agencies: Moody's Investors Service, Standard and Poor's, Fitch Ratings
Minimum amount outstanding of a candidate security: 1 billion US dollars, 1 billion euro, 500 million STG respectively
Securities shall be Bullet strategy
Securities shall have no call or put options
Fixed coupon type if a coupon bond
Not for private placement

Debt securities on the date of purchase will have a minimum remaining maturity of 0,25 years and are not to exceed three years.

The Fund assets were invested in the following currency composition:

US dollars	45%
Euro	45%
GB pounds	10%

Currency composition and the maturity restrictions are applicable to all Fund's assets and were subject to revisions by the Ministry of Finance.

== Reporting ==
The Ministry of Finance published a monthly report in mass media on the Fund's accumulation, spending and balance and reports quarterly and annually to the Government on accumulation, investment and spending of the Fund's capital. The Government reported quarterly and annually on the Fund's accumulation, spending and investment of capital to both chambers of the Russian Parliament (State Duma and Council of Federation).

== See also ==
- Banking in Russia
- Central Bank of Russia
- Federal budget of Russia
