= WGBI =

WGBI may refer to:

- An A.M. radio station on 910 kHz at Scranton, Pennsylvania, United States, which held the callsign WGBI from 1925 until 2005.
- An F.M. radio station on 101.3 MHz at Scranton, Pennsylvania, United States, which held the callsign WGBI-FM from 1948 until 1993.
- A television station on Channel 22 at Scranton, Pennsylvania, United States, which formerly held the callsign WGBI-TV from 1953 until 1958.
- FTSE World Government Bond Index
