= Salomon BIG =

The Salomon Broad Investment Grade Index (known as the Salomon BIG or Citigroup BIG) is a common American Bond index, akin to the S&P 500 for stocks, originally owned by Salomon Brothers, run by its successor, Citigroup and now by FTSE Russell. The BIG is generally used for managing broad debt portfolios from short to long-dated maturities, similar to the Barclays Capital Aggregate Bond Index ("Agg") or the Merrill Lynch Domestic Master.

The BIG includes treasuries, agency debt, corporates, non-corporate credit, mortgage-backed securities, and asset-backed securities (ABS). Unlike the Agg, it includes 144As, but unlike the Agg, it does not include municipals or commercial mortgage-backed securities (CMBS). Like the Agg, the BIG does not include any inflation-indexed bonds, and is limited to investment grade securities, including no high-yield debt or emerging market debt.

== See also ==
- Bond market index
