= FTSE World Government Bond Index =

- Foundation: January 1, 1985
- Operator: London Stock Exchange Group
- Exchanges: London Stock Exchange
- Trading symbol: WGBI
- Constituents: 41 Countries government bonds
- Type: Large cap
- Weighting method: market capitalization weighted
- Related indices: Bond market index
- Website: www.lseg.com/en/ftse-russell/indices/world-government-bond-index

Composition by country as of March 31, 2022
Country	Market Weight %
United States	40.52
EGBI*	31.63
Japan	16.03
United Kingdom	4.55
Others	7.28
* EGBI (FTSE EMU Government Bond Index) consists of EMU-participating countries that meet the WGBI criteria for market inclusion: Austria, Belgium, Finland, France, Germany, Ireland, Italy, Netherlands, and Spain

The FTSE World Government Bond Index (WGBI) is a market capitalization weighted bond index consisting of the government bond markets of the multiple countries. Country eligibility is determined based upon market capitalization and investability criteria. The index includes all fixed-rate bonds with a remaining maturity of one year or longer and with amounts outstanding of at least the equivalent of US$25 million. Government securities typically exclude floating or variable rate bonds, US/Canadian savings bonds and private placements. It is not possible to invest directly in such an index.

On August 31, 2017, London Stock Exchange Group (LSEG) completed the acquisition of The Yield Book and Citi Fixed Income Indices businesses from Citi. The name has been changed from the Salomon Smith Barney World Government Bond Index, to the Citigroup World Government Bond Index and now the FTSE World Government Bond Index.

== Countries included ==
Countries in the index include:

- Australia
- Austria
- Belgium
- Canada
- China
- Denmark
- Finland
- France
- Germany
- Ireland
- Israel
- Italy
- India
- Japan
- Malaysia
- Mexico
- Netherlands
- Portugal
- Singapore
- South Africa
- South Korea
- Spain
- Sweden
- Switzerland
- United Kingdom
- United States

== See also ==
- Bond market index
- Government bond
- List of bond market indices
