= Russian National Wealth Fund =

Sovereign wealth fund of the Russian Federation

- Native name: Фонд национального благосостояния России
- Industry: Sovereign wealth fund
- Founded: 2008
- Total assets: $130.8 bn (February 2024)
- Website: minfin.gov.ru/en/key/nationalwealthfund/

National Wealth Fund, 2008–2025, with the blue line showing the nominal value in billion USD and the red line showing the nominal value in billion RUB

The Russian National Wealth Fund (Russian: Фонд национального благосостояния России) is Russia's sovereign wealth fund. It was created after the Stabilization Fund of the Russian Federation was split into two separate investment funds on 30 January 2008. The National Wealth Fund (NWF) is controlled by the Russian Ministry of Finance.

== History ==
The rainy-day Reserve Fund is used to buffer the national budget, which is strongly tied to the price of crude oil

The two funds were the Reserve Fund (SFRF), which was invested abroad in low-yield securities and used when oil and gas incomes fall, and the National Wealth Fund, which invests in riskier, higher return vehicles, as well as federal budget expenditures. The SFRF was given $125 billion and the NWF was given $32 billion. The SFRF was exhausted by 2017. It had been depleted by budget deficits and the low oil prices, and therefore ceased to exist, leaving the NWF as the sole reserve fund of the Russian Federation.

In October 2008 the NWF was permitted to invest in shares on the Moscow Exchange or Saint Petersburg Stock Exchange, to support the country’s financial markets by buying shares in Russian companies, until December 2009. Support was also provided from the NWF to Russian banks, making the NWF a “lender of last resort” to banks.

One of the fund's main responsibilities is to support the Russian pension system, but since the closure of the SFRF the NWF also funds budget deficits.

Once the NWF's liquid assets exceeds 7% of GDP, the Government can spend money from the NWF, as it proposed to do in 2020 in order to fund infrastructure projects.

The budget for 2022 set an oil price of $44.2 per barrel, with the NWF receiving money if the price was over the set price and selling assets to support the government budget if the price was lower. In 2023 this was changed to set an annual target of $8 trillion rubles revenues from oil and gas, anything below that seeing funds being taken from the NWF to support the budget, anything above being added to the NWF. As it turned out, the revenue in 2023 was 8.8 trillion rubles.

Following the Russian invasion of Ukraine in 2022 1 trillion rubles ($10 billion) was ordered to be invested by the NWF in shares from Russian companies to support the stock markets and aid Russian firms. In January 2023 changes were proposed to allow "anti-crisis" investments to be made, with a cap of 4.25 trillion rubles ($61.24 billion) on these investments, irrespective of liquidity levels in the Fund which at that date stood at $87.2 billion, or 4.6% of GDP.

Funds in the NWF are composed of a liquid assets account and a long term investments account. Prior to 2021 the liquid assets were held in US dollars, Euros, UK Pounds, Yen, Yuan and Gold, in a strategy to minimize the effect on the account of foreign currency fluctuations. The NWF began selling some Sterling and all the US dollars in the summer of 2021, whilst buying Yuan to reach 30% and Euros to reach 40%, Sterling and Yen each at 5% and Gold 20% of the liquid fund value. After the start of the Russian invasion of Ukraine, management decided to close the Euro holdings. It aimed to achieve this before the end of 2023 in favour of Chinese yuan, which would be limited to 60% of the fund value, with gold limited to 40% of the liquid fund value.

On 27 December 2022 expenses of the NWF were limited in 2023-2025 to 8 trillion rubles ($114 billion) while the investment strategy changed to invest only in Chinese yuan.

In December 2022 long term investments stood at 4.3 trillion rubles, with liquid assets at 6.1 trillion rubles.

For 2024, Russia changed the funding rules again, so that the NWF will not receive the expected 2024 11.5 trillion rubles of oil revenue, which will go directly to the Russian budget instead, with just 1.8 trillion rubles projected to be being given to the NWF in 2025. The rules also changed to recover the 2023 surplus that had been paid to the NWF, so that from late 2023 the central bank restarted dealing in currencies in the NWF, to sell the budget adjustment of 2023, where 11.8 billion rubles will be sold daily until 28 June 2024. Currencies would also be sold/bought for the expected 2024 budget adjustment based on a set $60 per barrel from oil sales, expected to account for an average of 0.8 billion rubles in sales per day. This will reduce both the fund value and the liquid assets by around 2.3 trillion rubles by the end of 2024. The 2024-6 budget expects the NWF to hold a reduced 11.1 trillion rubles at January 2025 and 13.0 trillion at January 2026.

In November 2024, the NWF was made up of a total of 13 trillion rubles ($133.7 billion), of which 5 trillion were liquid assets, mostly in yuan and gold.

The NWF decreased its holdings of gold over the course of 2024 from 358.9 tons of the metal on 1 January 2024 to 187.7 tons on 31 December 2024, a reduction of 48% over the year.

== Major changes in NWF value ==
- In the second half of 2019, the effect of an OPEC+ agreement to increase oil prices resulted in Russia receiving a high level of revenues, allowing 4.04 trillion rubles ($65.1 billion) to be added to the NWF.
- In 2020, despite COVID-19 effects on the economy the NWF values increased by 50%, helped by high oil prices, and a surplus in the Russian budget in 2019.
- In 2022, with very high oil prices, additional funds would normally have been added to the Fund, however with the cost of the war with Ukraine, in October $16.2 billion was withdrawn from the $127.9 billion liquid portion of the NWF.
- In 2023, the budget deficit in December 2022 of 3.8 trillion rubles (€49.4 billion) and the effect of the 2022 Russian crude oil price cap sanctions required $38.1 billion to be withdrawn, with further withdrawals expected in 2023 as a result of the continuing sanctions over crude oil.

=== Major reductions in NWF liquid assets ===
Withdrawals
Date	billions of $	reason	Ref.
April 2020	28.3	to refloat 50%+1 shares of Sberbank	
June 2020	12.5	to cover budget deficit	
March 2022	10.0	to buy Russian company shares	
October 2022	16.2	to cover budget deficit	
January 2023	38.1	to cover budget deficit	
March 2023	7.0	to cover budget deficit	
Through 2023	12.0	to support airlines and purchase leased aircraft	
December 2023	32.9	to cover budget deficit	
December 2024	48% gold	to cover budget deficit	

== Overview ==
The National Wealth Fund will receive funds from investment returns and any excess funds from oil and gas revenues. The existence of the NWF helps with the credit rating for Russia, by providing a reserve to provide "resilience to short-term shocks".

According to the Russian Ministry of Finance, the foreign debt securities the fund can invest in must have credit ratings of AA− or higher by Fitch or Standard & Poor's, or a rating of Aa3 by Moody's. Despite this, the fund agreed to buy (on 17 December 2013) $15 billion of Ukrainian Eurobonds, despite the fact that Ukraine had lower credit ratings at the time.

The NWF stands out from other global funds with it gathering investments into the national economy itself instead investing everything overseas, so it can provide a boost to the slow modernization of Russian infrastructure in a time of otherwise anemic investment. Other countries like Indonesia are following the Russian example in running a National Wealth Fund it is reported in 2020. Of course, because of a lack of a real "hard currency" reserve, the fund can quickly lose value in a case of internal crisis.

In 2013, the NWF invested 150 billion rubles into the Trans-Siberian Railway and the Baikal-Amur railway.

The NWF approved the investment of $4.2 billion into the state's nuclear energy corporation Rosatom in June 2014. Another $4.2 billion was invested into the Russian Direct Investment Fund, which used a portion for two regional internet connection projects in December 2014. In December 2014, the NWF invested in VTB, Gazprombank and Rosselkhozbank equity. An additional 30-year deposit was made by the NWF to help the VTB bringing the total investment to $5.5 billion.

In 2016, NWF had invested $2.6 billion in the Yamal LNG plant.

In 2020, NWF bought 50% +1 share in Sberbank from Russia's Central Bank.

Starting from 2024, the NWF will invest $3.2 billion in an $11.2b project to build 600 civilian aircraft which will be sold to airlines at a below cost price.

There was an increase in oil and gas revenues in the first four months of 2024, but the Russian Ministry of Finance still reported that the NWF funds were used to cover profit shortages.

== Fund composition ==
All numbers are in billion, unless specified otherwise; the numbers in parentheses are the rough equivalent in US Dollars:

Date	Total USD	liquid assets						non-liquid assets	Ref.
Date	Total USD	EUR	GBP	JPY	CNY	RUB	Gold	non-liquid assets	Ref.
1 February 2022	$177.0B	38.56B ($43.6B)	4.18B ($5.6B)	600.30B ($5.2B)	226.70B ($35.6B)	142.1B ($1.8B)	405.7 tons ($23.5B)	$60.5B	
1 November 2022	$184.8B	45.73B ($45.2B)	4.94B ($4.3B)	692.70B ($4.6B)	309.72B ($42.4B)	.	554.9 tons ($29.2B)	$56.9B	
1 November 2023	$146.3B	3.66B ($3.9B)	.	.	279.77B ($38.2B)	0.26B ($0B)	508.3 tons ($32.7B)	$71.4B	
1 January 2024	$133.0B	.	.	.	227.33B ($31.8B)	1.51B ($0B)	359.0 tons ($23.8B)	$76.8B	
1 May 2024	$139.6B	.	.	.	227.62B ($31.4B)	0.30B ($0B)	334.4 tons ($33.5B)	$82.9B	
1 December 2024	$121.6B	.	.	.	219.50B ($30.2B)	1.43B ($0B)	279.6 tons ($23.8B)	$67.8B	
1 May 2025	$144.6B	.	.	.	164.60B ($22.6B)	0.40B ($0B)	168.1 tons ($17.5B)	$104.2B	
1 December 2025	$175.2B	.	.	.	209.20B ($29.6B)	1.70B ($0B)	173.0 tons ($24.1B)	$121.0B	
1 July 2026	$168.5B	.	.	.	189.80B ($28.0B)	.	141.1 tons ($18.8B)	$122.1B	

== Size of the fund and historic numbers ==
Source by the Ministry of Finance of Russia:

National Wealth Fund value
Date	total assets			liquid assets			Ref.
Date	billions of $	billions of ₽	% of GDP	billions of $	billions of ₽	% of GDP	Ref.
1 February 2008	32.00	783	1.9%		783		
1 January 2009	87.97	2 584	6.3%		2 584		
1 January 2010	91.56	2 769	7.1%		2 769		
1 January 2011	88.44	2 696	5.8%		2 695		
1 January 2012	86.79	2 794	4.6%		2 794		
1 January 2013	88.59	2 691	4.0%		2 690		
1 January 2014	88.63	2 901	4.0%		2 900		
1 January 2015	78.00	4 388	5.3%		4 388		
1 January 2016	71.72	5 227	6.1%		5 227		
1 January 2017	71.87	4 359	4.7%		4 359		
1 January 2018	65.15	3 753	3.6%		3 752		
1 January 2019	58.10	4 036	3.7%		4 036		
1 January 2020	125.56	7 773	7.3%				
1 January 2021	183.96	13 546	11.7%	117.20	8 659	7.5%	
1 November 2021	197.75	13 945	12.1%				
1 February 2022	177.00	13 600	10.2%	116.50	9 730	7.3%	
1 March 2022	131.00	12 935	9.7%				
1 August 2022	201.00	12 155	9.1%	141.30	8 700	6.5%	
1 October 2022	187.98	10 792	8.1%	131.06	7 524	5.6%	
1 November 2022	184.84	11 374	8.5%	127.94	7 873	5.9%	
1 January 2023	148.40	10 435	7.8%				
1 February 2023	155.30	10 808	7.2%				
1 March 2023	147.20	11 106	7.4%	81.14	6 450	4.3%	
1 April 2023	154.50	12 282	7.9%	84.41	6 710	4.5%	
1 May 2023	162.00	12 476	8.3%	84.00	6 820	4.6%	
1 June 2023	153.10	12 357	8.2%	82.27	6 640	4.4%	
1 July 2023	145.58	12 670	8.4%				
1 August 2023	146.34	13 313	8.9%	75.50	7 183	4.8%	
1 September 2023	142.80	13 704	9.1%	75.59	7 252	4.8%	
1 October 2023	140.11	13 648	9.1%	73.30	7 140	4.8%	
1 November 2023	146.31	13 541	9.0%	74.92	6 938	4.6%	
1 December 2023	151.13	13 432	9.0%	75.83	6 740	4.5%	
1 January 2024	133.41	11 965	8.0%	56.60	5 010	3.3%	
1 February 2024	130.80	11 922	6.6%	53.00	4 900	2.7%	
1 March 2024	135.00	12 258	6.8%	54.90	5 045	2.8%	
1 April 2024	135.70	12 534	7.0%	55.49	5 088	2.8%	
1 May 2024	139.60	12 750	7.1%	56.70	5 172	2.9%	
1 June 2024	142.00	12 703	7.1%	56.70	5 046	2.8%	
1 July 2024	146.96	12 600	7.0%	52.53	4 603	2.6%	
1 August 2024	142.58	12 300	6.4%	54.01	4 665	2.4%	
1 September 2024	133.42	12 166	6.4%	53.24	4 854	2.4%	
1 October 2024	133.70	12 787	6.7%	54.90	5 255	2.7%	
1 November 2024	131.13	12 730	6.6%	56.13	5 447	2.8%	
1 December 2024	121.56	13 097	6.8%	53.76	5 792	3.0%	
1 January 2025	116.04	11 880	6.2%	37.47	3 810	2.0%	
1 February 2025	122.09	11 970	5.6%	38.27	3 751	1.7%	
1 March 2025	135.47	11 880	5.5%	38.70	3 394	1.6%	
1 April 2025	140.40	11 750	5.5%	39.06	3 269	1.5%	
1 May 2025	144.60	11 790	5.5%	40.42	3 297	1.5%	
1 June 2025	148.80	11 700	5.5%	36.16	2 840	1.3%	
1 July 2025	166.80	13 090	5.9%	52.60	4 130	1.9%	
1 August 2025	159.80	13 080	5.9%	48.30	3 950	1.8%	
1 September 2025	163.60	13 140	5.9%	48.90	3 930	1.8%	
1 October 2025	158.84	13 163	5.9%	50.26	4 165	1.8%	
1 November 2025	162.95	13 100	6.0%	51.83	4 200	1.9%	
1 December 2025	175.21	13 300	6.1%	54.21	4 115	1.9%	
1 February 2026	177.00	13 640	5.8%	55.10	4 230	1.8%	
1 April 2026	165.00	13 410	5.6%	47.80	3 900	1.7%	
1 June 2026	182.40	12 955	5.5%	48.05	3 410	1.5%	
1 July 2026	168.50	13 104	5.6%	46.40	3 610	1.5%	
1 August 2026	159.30	12 720	5.4%	46.20	3 690	1.6%	
1 September 2026	154.10	13 190	5.6%	46.70	4 000	1.7%	
1 October 2026	151.85	12 980	5.5%	44.45	3 800	1.6%	
Date	billions of $	billions of ₽	% of GDP	billions of $	billions of ₽	% of GDP	Ref.
Date	total assets			liquid assets			Ref.

== Sanctions ==
Following the 2022 Russian invasion of Ukraine, several countries imposed economic sanctions on Russian banks, individuals and companies. On 22 February 2022, United States President Joe Biden announced new restrictions on activities involving the National Wealth Fund. The EU adopted sanctions in its 10th package in February 2023.

Assets in June 2023 include €9 billion that is frozen in foreign banks by sanctions.

== See also ==
- Russian Direct Investment Fund
