= List of bond market indices =

Bond market indices include global and country-specific indices, as well as indices for government, emerging-market, and high-yield bonds. This list also includes indices for leveraged loans and asset-backed securities.

== Global ==
- (Bank of America) Merrill Lynch Global Bond Index
- Bloomberg Barclays Global Aggregate Bond Index
- Citi World Broad Investment-Grade Bond Index (WorldBIG)

== Countries ==
=== Switzerland ===
- Swiss Bond Index

== Government bonds ==
- Bloomberg Barclays US Treasury Index
- Barclays Inflation-Linked Euro Government Bond Index
- Citi World Government Bond Index (WGBI)
- FTSE UK Gilts Index Series
- J.P. Morgan Government Bond Index

== Most traded government bonds ==
Country	Issuer	Bond Type	Currency
Australia	Office of Financial Management	Treasury Indexed Bonds (TIBs)	AUD ($)
Canada	Bank of Canada	Marketable Bonds	CAD ($)
China	Ministry of Finance	People's Bank of China (PBC) Bonds	CNY (¥)
France	Agence France Tresor (French Treasury)	Obligation Assimilable du Tresor (OAT)	EUR (€)
Germany	Finanzagentur (German Finance Agency)	Bundesanleihen	EUR (€)
Japan	Ministry of Finance	Japanese Government Bonds (JGB)	JPY (¥)
South Korea	Ministry of Economy and Finance	Korea Treasury Bonds (KTB)	KRW (₩)
United Kingdom	UK Debt Management Office	Gilts	GBP (£)
United States	Bureau of Public Debt	US Treasuries	USD ($)

== Emerging market bonds ==
- J.P. Morgan Emerging Markets Bond Index
- Citi Emerging Markets Broad Bond Index (EMUSDBBI)

== High-yield bonds ==
- (Bank of America) Merrill Lynch High-Yield Master II
- Barclays High-Yield Index
- Bear Stearns High-Yield Index
- Citi US High-Yield Market Index
- (Credit Suisse) First Boston High-Yield II Index
- S&P US Issued High-Yield Corporate Bond Inex

== Leveraged loans ==
- S&P Leveraged Loan Index

== Asset-backed securities ==
- Markit ABX.HE
- Markit IBoxx

== See also ==
- Bond market index
- List of stock market indices

=== Lists ===
- List of stock exchanges
- List of African stock exchanges
- List of American stock exchanges
- List of East Asian stock exchanges
- List of European stock exchanges
- List of South Asian stock exchanges
