= Economics of English towns and trade in the Middle Ages =

The economics of English towns and trade in the Middle Ages is the economic history of English towns and trade from the Norman invasion in 1066, to the death of Henry VII in 1509. Although England's economy was fundamentally agricultural throughout the period, even before the invasion the market economy was important to producers. Norman institutions, including serfdom, were superimposed on a mature network of well-established towns involved in international trade. Over the next five centuries the English economy would at first grow and then suffer an acute crisis, resulting in significant political and economic change. Despite economic dislocation in urban areas, including shifts in the holders of wealth and the location of these economies, the economic output of towns developed and intensified over the period. By the end of the period, England would have a weak early modern government overseeing an economy involving a thriving community of indigenous English merchants and corporations.

== Invasion and the early Norman period (1066–1100) ==
William the Conqueror invaded England in 1066, defeating the Anglo-Saxon King Harold Godwinson at the Battle of Hastings and placing the country under Norman rule. This campaign was followed by fierce military operations known as the Harrying of the North between 1069–1070, extending Norman authority across the north of England. William's system of government was broadly feudal in that the right to possess land was linked to service to the king, but in many other ways the invasion did little to alter the nature of the English economy. Most of the damage done in the invasion was in the north and the west of England, some of it still recorded as "wasteland" in 1086. Many of the key features of the English trading and financial system remained in place in the decades immediately after the conquest.

=== Trade, manufacturing and the towns ===
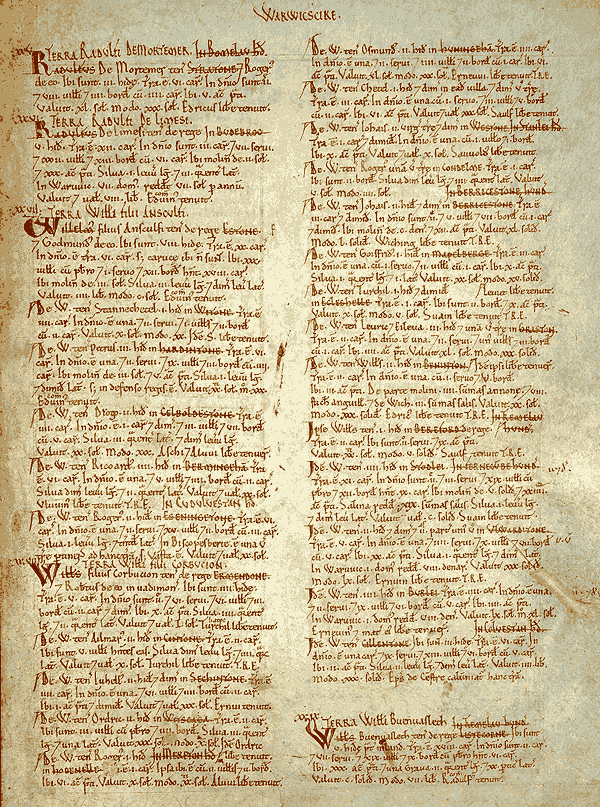
A page of the Domesday Book, capturing the economic condition of England in 1086.

Although primarily rural, England had a number of old, economically important towns in 1066. A large amount of trade came through the Eastern towns, including London, York, Winchester, Lincoln, Norwich, Ipswich and Thetford. Much of this trade was with France, the Low Countries and Germany, but the North-East of England traded with partners as far away as Sweden. Cloth was already being imported to England before the invasion through the mercery trade.

Some towns, such as York, suffered from Norman sacking during William's northern campaigns. Other towns saw the widespread demolition of houses to make room for new motte and bailey fortifications, as was the case in Lincoln. The Norman invasion also brought significant economic changes with the arrival of the first Jews to English cities. William I brought over wealthy Jews from the Rouen community in Normandy to settle in London, apparently to carry out financial services for the crown. In the years immediately after the invasion, a lot of wealth was drawn out of England in various ways by the Norman rulers and reinvested in Normandy, making William immensely wealthy as an individual ruler.

The minting of coins was decentralised in the Saxon period; every borough was mandated to have a mint and therefore a centre for trading in bullion. Nonetheless, there was strict royal control over these moneyers and coin dies could only be made in London. William retained this arrangement and also maintained a high coin standard, which led to the use of the term sterling for Norman silver coins.

=== Governance and taxation ===
William I inherited the Anglo-Saxon system in which the king drew his revenues from a mixture of customs; profits from re-minting coinage; fines; profits from his own demesne lands, and the system of English land-based taxation called the geld. William reaffirmed this system, enforcing collection of the geld through his new system of sheriffs and increasing the taxes on trade. William was also famous for commissioning the Domesday Book in 1086, a vast document which attempted to record the economic condition of his new kingdom.

== Mid-medieval growth (1100–1290) ==
The 12th and 13th centuries were a period of huge economic growth in England. The population of England rose from around one and a half million in 1086 to around four or five million in 1300, stimulating increased agricultural outputs and the export of raw materials to Europe. In contrast to the previous two centuries, England was relatively secure from invasion. Except for the years of the Anarchy, most military conflicts either had only localised economic impact or proved only temporarily disruptive. English economic thinking remained conservative, seeing the economy as consisting of three groups: the ordines, those who fought, or the nobility; laboratores, those who worked, in particular the peasantry; and oratores, those who prayed, or the clerics. Trade and merchants played little part in this model and were frequently vilified at the start of the period, although increasingly tolerated towards the end of the 13th century.

=== Trade, manufacturing and the towns ===
==== Growth of English towns ====
The medieval plan for Liverpool, a new English town founded by order of King John in 1207.

After the end of the Anarchy, the number of small towns in England began to increase sharply. By 1297 a hundred and twenty new towns had established and in 1350, by when the expansion had effectively ceased, there were around 500 towns in England. Many of these new towns were centrally planned—Richard I created Portsmouth, John founded Liverpool, with Harwich, Stony Stratford, Dunstable, Royston, Baldock, Wokingham, Maidenhead and Reigate following under successive monarchs. The new towns were usually located with access to trade routes, rather than defence, in mind. The streets were laid out to make access to the town's market convenient. A growing percentage of England's population lived in urban areas; estimates suggest that this rose from around 5.5% in 1086 to up to 10% in 1377.

London held a special status within the English economy. The nobility purchased and consumed many luxury goods and services in the capital, and as early as the 1170s the London markets were providing exotic products such as spices, incense, palm oil, gems, silks, furs and foreign weapons. London was also an important hub for industrial activity; it had many blacksmiths making a wide range of goods, including decorative ironwork and early clocks. Pewter-working, using English tin and lead, was also widespread in London during the period. The provincial towns also had a substantial number of trades by the end of the 13th century—a large town like Coventry, for example, contained over three hundred different specialist occupations, and a smaller town such as Durham could support some sixty different professions. The increasing wealth of the nobility and the church was reflected in the widespread building of cathedrals and other prestigious buildings in the larger towns, in turn making use of lead from English mines for roofing.

Land transport remained much more expensive than river or sea transport during the period. Many towns in this period, including York, Exeter and Lincoln, were linked to the oceans by navigable rivers and could act as seaports, with Bristol's port coming to dominate the lucrative trade in wine with Gascony by the 13th century, but shipbuilding generally remained on a modest scale and economically unimportant to England at this time. Transport remained very costly in comparison to the overall price of products. By the 13th century, groups of common carriers ran carting businesses, with carting brokers existing in London to link traders and carters. These used the four major land routes crossing England: Ermine Street, the Fosse Way, Icknield Street and Watling Street. A large number of bridges were built during the 12th century to improve the trade network.

In the 13th century, England was still primarily supplying raw materials for export to Europe, rather than finished or processed goods. There were some exceptions, such as very high quality cloths from Stamford and Lincoln, including the famous "Lincoln Scarlet" dyed cloth. Despite royal efforts to encourage it, barely any English cloth was being exported by 1347.

==== Expansion of the money supply ====
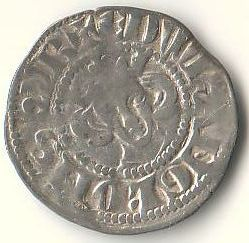
An Edward I silver penny from Lincoln; Edward increased the controls on the minting of coins begun under Henry II, creating the Master of the Mint.

There was a gradual reduction in the number of locations allowed to mint coins in England; under Henry II, only 30 boroughs were still able to use their own moneyers and the tightening of controls continued throughout the 13th century. By the reign of Edward I there were only nine mints outside London and the king created a new official called the Master of the Mint to oversee these and the thirty furnaces operating in London to meet the supply for new coins. The amount of money in circulation hugely increased in this period; before the Norman invasion there had been around £50,000 in circulation as coin, but by 1311 this had risen to more than £1m. The physical implication of this growth was that coins had to be manufactured in large numbers, being moved in barrels and sacks to be stored in local treasuries for royal use as the king travelled. During the 13th Century, nominal wages fluctuated, but the overall trend was flat. As a result of the increase in money supply, prices in general increased significantly over the course of the century. As a result of the price inflation, real wages—one of the stickiest of prices—declined steadily.

==== Rise of the guilds ====
The first English guilds emerged during the early 12th century. These guilds were fraternities of craftsmen that set out to manage their local affairs including "prices, workmanship, the welfare of its workers and the suppression of interlopers and sharp practices". Amongst these early guilds were the "guilds merchants", who ran the local markets in towns and represented the merchant community in discussions with the crown. Other early guilds included the "craft guilds", representing specific trades. By 1130 there were major weavers' guilds in six English towns, as well as a fullers guild in Winchester. Over the coming decades more guilds were created, often becoming increasingly involved in both local and national politics, although the guilds merchants were largely replaced by official groups established by new royal charters.

The craft guilds required relatively stable markets and a relative equality of income and opportunity amongst their members to function effectively. By the 14th century these conditions were increasingly uncommon. The first strains were seen in London, where the old guild system began to collapse – more trade was being conducted at a national level, making it hard for craftsmen to both manufacture goods and trade in them, and there were growing disparities in incomes between the richer and poor craftsmen. As a result, under Edward III many guilds became companies or livery companies, chartered companies focusing on trade and finance (the management of large amounts of money), leaving the guild structures to represent the interests of the smaller, poorer manufacturers.

==== Merchants and the development of the charter fairs ====
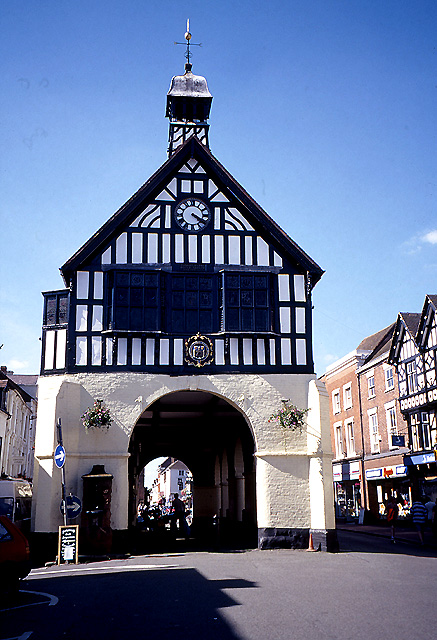
The market place at Bridgnorth, one of many medieval English towns to be granted the right to hold fairs, in this case annually on the feast of the Translation of St. Leonard.

The period also saw the development of charter fairs in England, which reached their heyday in the 13th century. From the 12th century onwards, many English towns acquired a charter from the Crown allowing them to hold an annual fair, usually serving a regional or local customer base and lasting for two or three days. The practice increased in the next century and over 2,200 charters were issued to markets and fairs by English kings between 1200 and 1270. Fairs grew in popularity as the international wool trade increased: the fairs allowed English wool producers and ports on the east coast to engage with visiting foreign merchants, circumnavigating those English merchants in London keen to make a profit as middlemen. At the same time, wealthy magnate consumers in England began to use the new fairs as a way to buy goods like spices, wax, preserved fish and foreign cloth in bulk from the international merchants at the fairs, again bypassing the usual London merchants.

Some fairs grew into major international events, falling into a set sequence during the economic year, with the Stamford fair in Lent, St Ives' in Easter, Boston's in July, Winchester's in September and Northampton's in November, with the many smaller fairs falling in-between. Although not as large as the famous Champagne fairs in France, these English "great fairs" were still huge events; St Ives' Great Fair, for example, drew merchants from Flanders, Brabant, Norway, Germany and France for a four-week event each year, turning the normally small town into "a major commercial emporium".

The structure of the fairs reflected the importance of foreign merchants in the English economy and by 1273 only one third of the English wool trade was actually controlled by English merchants. Between 1280–1320 the trade was primarily dominated by Italian merchants, but by the early 14th century German merchants had begun to present serious competition to the Italians. The Germans formed a self-governing alliance of merchants in London called the "Hanse of the Steelyard"—the eventual Hanseatic League—and their role was confirmed under the Great Charter of 1303, which exempted them from paying the customary tolls for foreign merchants. (Note: "Hanse" is the old English word for "group".) One response to this was the creation of the Company of the Staple, a group of merchants established in English-held Calais in 1314 with royal approval, who were granted a monopoly on wool sales to Europe.

==== Jewish contribution to the English economy ====
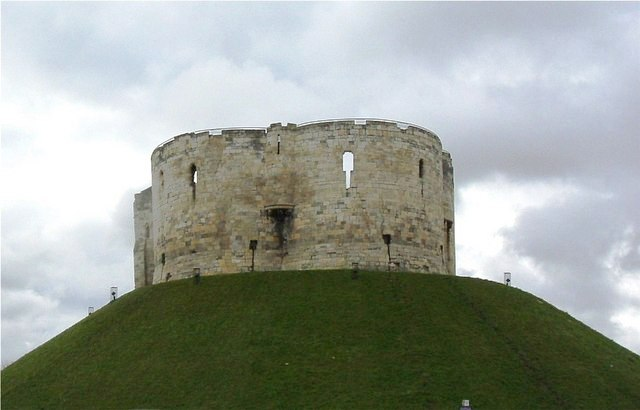
Clifford's Tower in the city of York, a major hub for Jewish economic activity and the site of an early Jewish pogrom in 1190.

The Jewish community in England continued to provide essential money lending and banking services that were otherwise banned by the usury laws, and grew in the 12th century by Jewish immigrants fleeing the fighting around Rouen. The Jewish community spread beyond London to eleven major English cities, primarily the major trading hubs in the east of England with functioning mints, all with suitable castles for protection of the often persecuted Jewish minority. By the time of the Anarchy and the reign of Stephen, the communities were flourishing and providing financial loans to the king.

Under Henry II, the Jewish financial community continued to grow richer still. All major towns had Jewish centres and even smaller towns, such as Windsor, saw visits travelling Jewish merchants. Henry II used the Jewish community as "instruments for the collection of money for the Crown", and placed them under royal protection. The Jewish community at York lent extensively to fund the Cistercian order's acquisition of land and prospered considerably. Some Jewish merchants grew extremely wealthy, Aaron of Lincoln so much that upon his death a special royal department had to be established to unpick his financial holdings and affairs.

By the end of Henry's reign the king ceased to borrow from the Jewish community and instead turned to an aggressive campaign of tallage taxation and fines. Financial and anti-Semite violence grew under Richard I. After the massacre of the York community in which numerous financial records were destroyed, seven towns were nominated to separately store Jewish bonds and money records and this arrangement ultimately evolved into the Exchequer of the Jews. After an initially peaceful start to John's reign, the king again began to extort money from the Jewish community, imprisoning the wealthier members, including Isaac of Norwich, until a huge, new taillage was paid. During the Baron's War of 1215–1217, the Jews were subjected to fresh anti-Semitic attacks. Henry III restored some order and Jewish money-lending became sufficiently successful again to allow fresh taxation. The Jewish community became poorer towards the end of the century and was finally expelled from England in 1290 by Edward I, being largely replaced by foreign merchants.

=== Governance and taxation ===
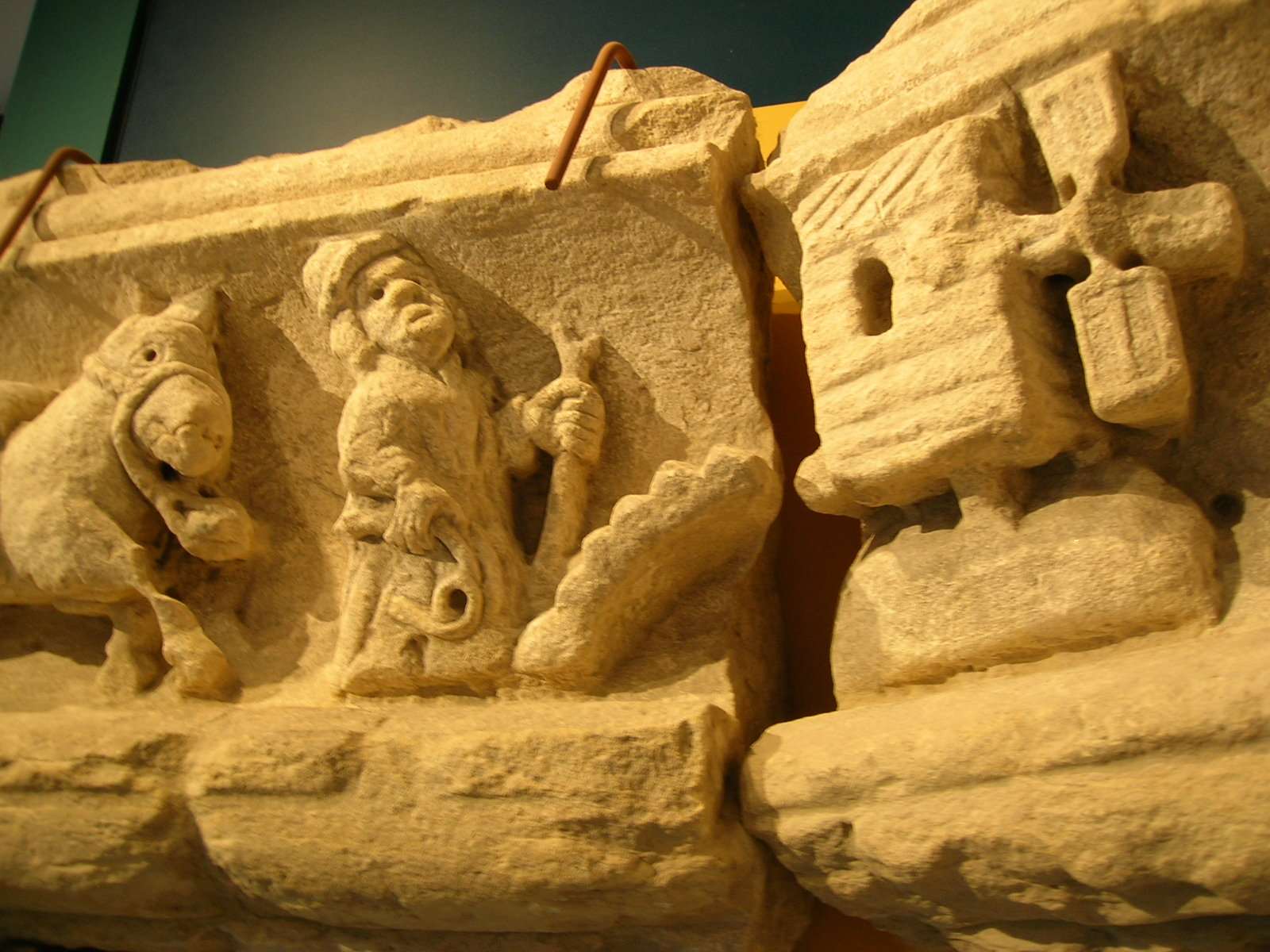
A medieval carving from Rievaulx Abbey showing of one of the many new windmills established during the 13th century.

During the 12th century the Norman kings attempted to formalise the feudal governance system initially created after the invasion. After the invasion the king had enjoyed combination of income from his own demesne lands, the Anglo-Saxon geld tax and fines. Successive kings found that they needed additional revenues, especially in order to pay for mercenary forces. One way of doing this was to exploit the feudal system, and kings adopted the French feudal aid model, a levy of money imposed on feudal subordinates when necessary; another method was to exploit the scutage system, in which feudal military service could be transmuted to a cash payment to the king. Taxation was also an option, although the old geld tax was increasingly ineffective due to an increasing number of exemptions. Instead a succession of kings created alternative land taxes, such as the tallage and carucage taxes. These were increasingly unpopular and, along with the feudal charges, were condemned and constrained in Magna Carta of 1215. As part of the formalisation of the royal finances, Henry I created the Chancellor of the Exchequer, a post which would lead to the maintenance of the Pipe rolls, a set of royal financial records of lasting significance to historians in tracking both royal finances and medieval prices.

Royal revenue streams still proved insufficient and from the middle of the 13th century there was a shift away from the earlier land based tax system towards one based on a mixture of indirect and direct taxation. At the same time Henry III of England had introduced the practice of consulting with leading nobles on tax issues, leading to the system of the English parliament agreeing on new taxes when required. In 1275, the "Great and Ancient Custom" began to tax woollen products and hides, with the Great Charter of 1303 imposing additional levies on foreign merchants in England, with the poundage tax introduced in 1347. In 1340, the discredited tallage tax system was finally abolished by Edward III.

In the English towns the burgage tenure for urban properties was established early on in the medieval period, being based primarily on tenants paying cash rents rather than providing labour services. Further development of a set of taxes that could be raised by the towns, including murage for walls, pavage for streets or pontage, a temporary tax for the repair of bridges. Combined with the lex mercatoria, which was a set of codes and customary practices governing trading, provided a reasonable basis for the economic governance of the towns.

The 12th century also saw a concerted attempt to curtail the remaining rights of unfree peasant workers and to set out their labour rents more explicitly in the form of the English Common Law. This process resulted in Magna Carta explicitly authorising feudal landowners to settle law cases concerning feudal labour and fines through their own manorial courts rather than through the royal courts.

== Mid-medieval economic crisis: the Great Famine and the Black Death (1290–1350) ==
The Black Death reached England in 1348 from Europe.

=== Great Famine ===
The Great Famine of 1315 began a number of acute crises in the English agrarian economy. The famine centred on a sequence of harvest failures in 1315, 1316 and 1321, combined with an outbreak of the murrain sickness amongst sheep and oxen between 1319–1321 and the fatal ergotism fungi amongst the remaining stocks of wheat. In the ensuing famine, many people died and the peasantry were said to have been forced to eat horses, dogs and cats as well to have conducted cannibalism against children, although these last reports are usually considered to be exaggerations. Poaching and encroachment on the royal forests surged, sometimes on a mass scale. Sheep and cattle numbers fell by up to a half, significantly reducing the availability of wool and meat, and food prices almost doubled, with grain prices particularly inflated. Food prices remained at similar levels for the next decade. Salt prices also increased sharply due to the wet weather.

Various factors exacerbated the crisis. Economic growth had already begun to slow significantly in the years prior to the crisis and the English rural population was increasingly under economic stress, with around half the peasantry estimated to possess insufficient land to provide them with a secure livelihood. Where additional land was being brought into cultivation, or existing land cultivated more intensively, the soil may have become exhausted and useless. Bad weather also played an important part in the disaster; 1315-6 and 1318 saw torrential rains and an incredibly cold winter, which in combination badly impacted on harvests and stored supplies. The rains of these years was followed by drought in the 1320s and another fierce winter in 1321, complicating recovery. Disease, independent of the famine, was also high during the period, striking at the wealthier as well as the poorer classes. The commencement of war with France in 1337 only added to the economic difficulties. The Great Famine firmly reversed the population growth of the 12th and 13th centuries and left a domestic economy that was "profoundly shaken, but not destroyed".

=== Black Death ===
The Black Death epidemic first arrived in England in 1348, re-occurring in waves during 1360–1362, 1368–1369, 1375 and more sporadically thereafter. The most immediate economic impact of this disaster was the widespread loss of life, between around 27% mortality amongst the upper classes, to 40–70% amongst the peasantry. (Note: The precise mortality figures for the Black Death have debated at length for many years.) Despite the very high loss of life, few settlements were abandoned during the epidemic itself, but many were badly affected or nearly eliminated altogether. The medieval authorities did their best to respond in an organised fashion, but the economic disruption was immense. Building work ceased and many mining operations paused. In the short term, efforts were taken by the authorities to control wages and enforce pre-epidemic working conditions. Coming on top of the previous years of famine, however, the longer term economic implications were profound. In contrast to the previous centuries of rapid growth, the English population would not begin to recover for over a century, despite the many positive reasons for a resurgence. The crisis would dramatically affect English agriculture, wages and prices for the remainder of the medieval period.

== Late medieval economic recovery (1350–1509) ==
The events of the crisis between 1290 and 1348 and the subsequent epidemics produced many challenges for the English economy. In the decades after the disaster, the economic and social issues arising from the Black Death combined with the costs of the Hundred Years War to produce the Peasants Revolt of 1381. Although the revolt was suppressed, it undermined many of the vestiges of the feudal economic order and the countryside became dominated by estates organised as farms, frequently owned or rented by the new economic class of the gentry. The English agricultural economy remained depressed throughout the 15th century, with growth coming from the greatly increased English cloth trade and manufacturing. The economic consequences of this varied considerably from region to region, but generally London, the South and the West prospered at the expense of the Eastern and the older cities. The role of merchants and of trade became increasingly seen as important to the country and usury became increasingly accepted, with English economic thinking increasingly influenced by Renaissance humanist theories.

=== Governance and taxation ===
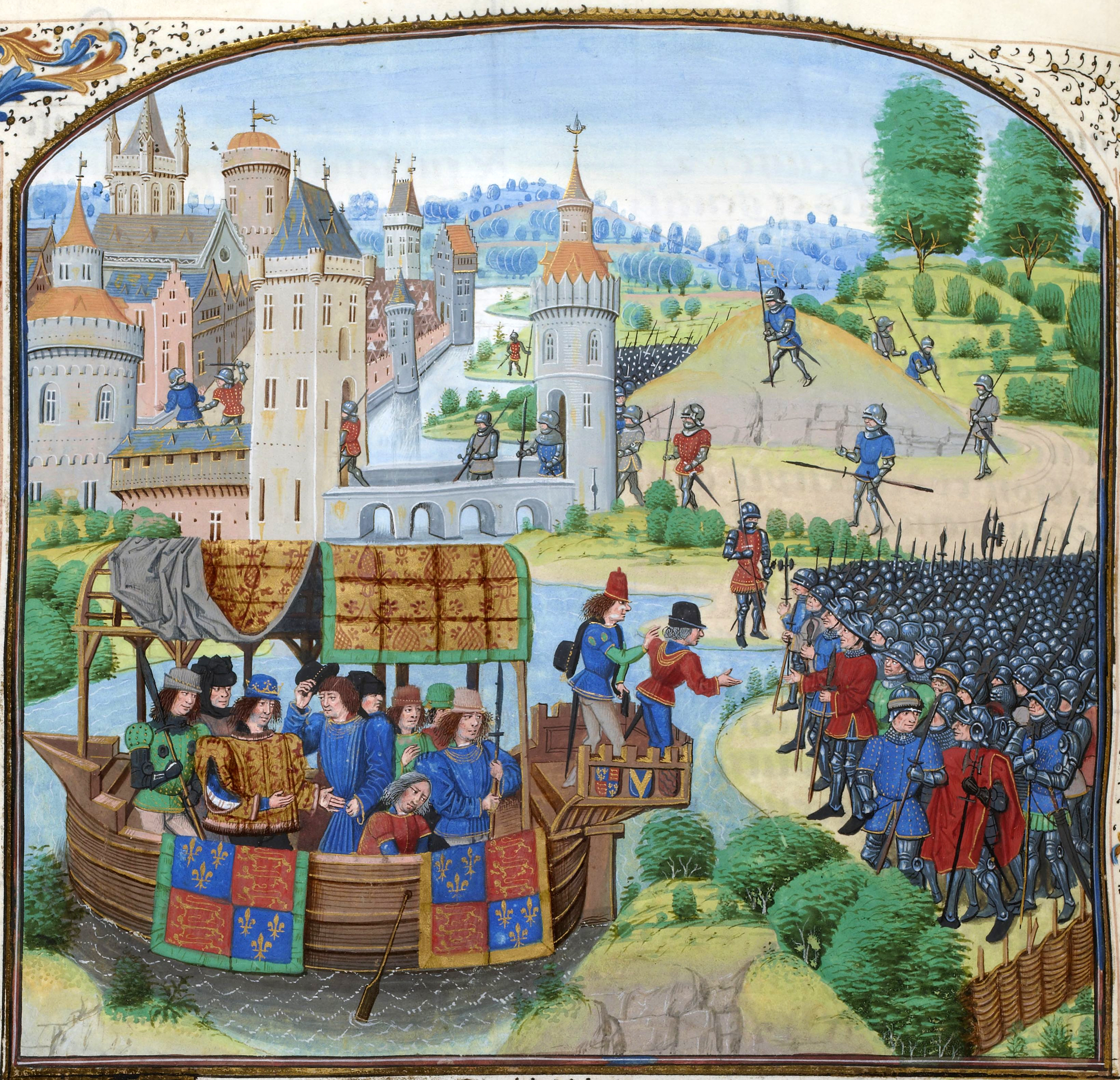
Richard II meets the rebels calling for economic and political reform during the Peasants Revolt of 1381.

Even before the end of the first outbreak of the Black Death, there were efforts by the authorities to stem the upward pressure on wages and prices, with parliament passing the emergency Ordinance of Labourers in 1349 and the Statute of Labourers in 1351. The efforts to regulate the economy continued as wages and prices rose, putting pressure on the landed classes, and in 1363 parliament attempted unsuccessfully to centrally regulate craft production, trading and retailing. A rising amount of the royal courts' time was involved in enforcing the failing labour legislation—as much as 70% by the 1370s. Many land owners attempted to vigorously enforce rents payable through agricultural service rather than money through their local manor courts, leading to many village communities attempting to legally challenge local feudal practices using the Domesday Book as a legal basis for their claims. With the wages of the lower classes still rising, the government also attempted to regulate demand and consumption by reinstating the sumptuary laws in 1363. These laws banned the lower classes from consuming certain products or wearing high status clothes, and reflected the significance of the consumption of high quality breads, ales and fabrics as a way of signifying social class in the late medieval period.

The 1370s also saw the government facing difficulties in funding the war with France. The impact of the Hundred Years War on the English economy as a whole remains uncertain; one suggestion is that the high taxation required to pay for the conflict "shrunk and depleted" the English economy, whilst others have argued for the war having a more modest or even neutral economic impact. The English government clearly found it difficult to pay for its army and from 1377 turned to a new system of poll taxes, aiming to spread the costs of taxation across the entire of English society.

==== Peasants' Revolt of 1381 ====
One result of the economic and political tensions was the Peasants' Revolt of 1381 in which widespread rural discontent was followed by invasion of London involving thousands of rebels. The rebels had many demands, including the effective end of the feudal institution of serfdom and a cap on the levels of rural rents. The ensuing violence took the political classes by surprise and the revolt was not fully put down until the autumn, with up to 7,000 rebels being executed in the aftermath. As a result of the revolt, parliament retreated from the poll tax and instead focused on a system of indirect taxes centring on foreign trade, with 80% of tax revenues drawn from the exports of wool. Parliament continued to collect direct tax levies at historically high levels up until 1422, although they reduced in later years. As a result, successive monarchs found that their tax revenues were uncertain, with Henry VI enjoying less than half the annual tax revenue of the late 14th century. England's monarchs became increasingly dependent on borrowing and forced loans to meet the gap between taxes and expenditure and even then faced later rebellions over levels of taxation, including the Yorkshire rebellion of 1489 and the Cornish rebellion of 1497 during the reign of Henry VII.

=== Trade, manufacturing and the towns ===
==== Shrinking towns ====
The percentage of England's population living in towns continued to grow but in absolute terms English towns shrunk significantly as a consequence of the Black Death, especially in the formerly prosperous east. The importance of England's Eastern ports declined over the period, as trade from London and the South-West increased in relative significance. Increasingly elaborate road networks were built across England, some involving the construction of up to thirty bridges to cross rivers and other obstacles. Nonetheless, it remained cheaper to move goods by water, and consequently timber was brought to London from as far away as the Baltic, and stone from Caen brought over the Channel to the South of England. Shipbuilding, particular in the South-West, became a major industry for the first time and investment in trading ships such as cogs was probably the single biggest form of late medieval investment in England.

==== Rise of the cloth trade ====
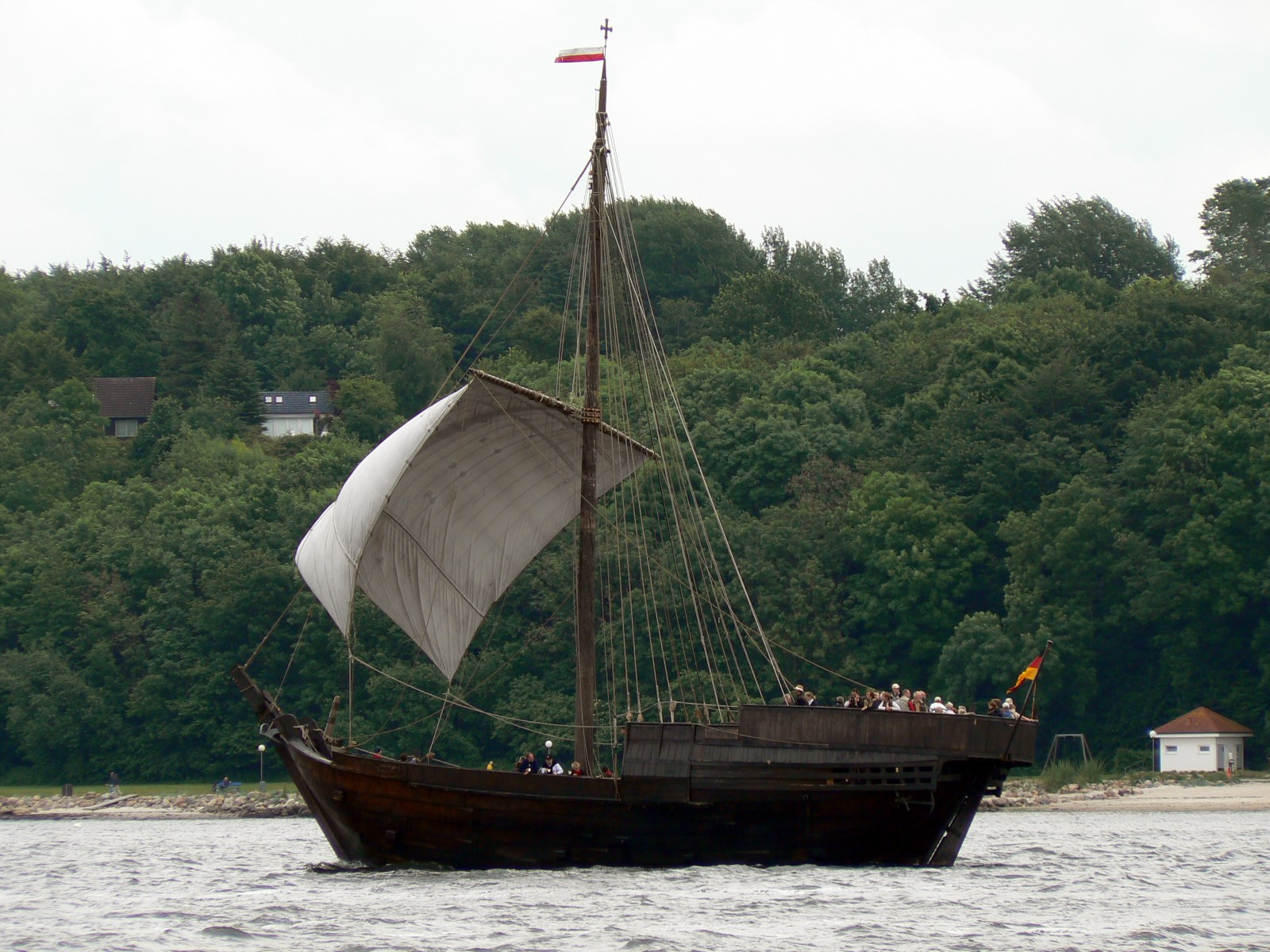
Cog ships were increasingly important to English trade as both exports and imports grew.

Cloth manufactured in England increasingly dominated European markets during the 15th and early 16th centuries. England exported almost no cloth at all in 1347, but by 1400 around 40,000 cloths (Note: A "cloth" in medieval times was a single piece of woven fabric from a loom of a fixed size; an English broadcloth, for example, was 24 yards long and 1.75 yards wide (22 m by 1.6 m).) a year were being exported – the trade reached its first peak in 1447 when exports reached 60,000. Trade fell slightly during the serious depression of the mid-15th century, but picked up again and reached 130,000 cloths a year by the 1540s. The centres of weaving in England shifted westwards towards the Stour Valley, the West Riding, the Cotswolds and Exeter, away from the former weaving centres in York, Coventry and Norwich.

The wool and cloth trade was primarily now being run by English merchants themselves rather than by foreigners. Increasingly, the trade was also passing through London and the ports of the South-West. By the 1360s, between 66 and 75% of the export trade was in English hands and by the 15th century this had risen to 80%, with London managing around 50% of these exports in 1400, and as much as 83% of wool and cloth exports by 1540. The growth in the numbers of chartered trading companies in London, such as the Worshipful Company of Drapers or the Company of Merchant Adventurers of London continued and English producers began to provide credit to European buyers, rather than the other way around. Usury grew during the period, with few cases being prosecuted by the authorities.

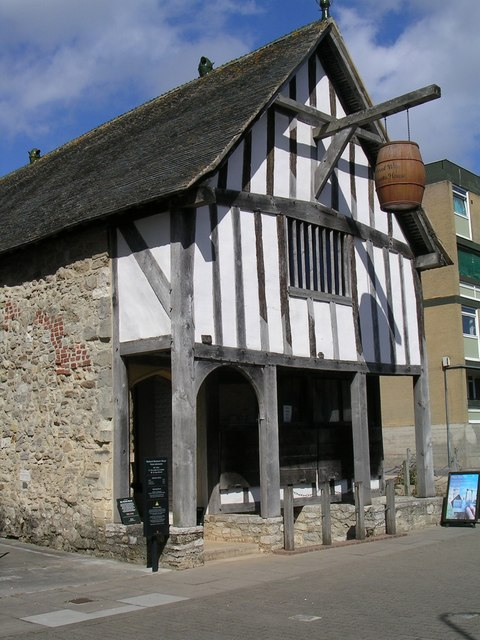
A medieval merchant's trading house in Southampton, restored to its mid-14th-century appearance.

There were some reversals. The attempts of English merchants to break through the Hanseatic league directly into the Baltic markets failed in the domestic political chaos of the Wars of the Roses in the 1460s and 1470s. The wine trade with Gascony fell by half during the war with France, and the eventual loss of the province brought an end to the English domination of the business and temporary disruption to Bristol's prosperity until Spanish wines began to be imported through the city a few years later. Indeed, the disruption to both the Baltic and the Gascon trade contributed to a sharp reduction in the consumption of furs and wine by the English gentry and nobility during the 15th century.

There were advances in manufacturing, especially in the South and West. Despite some French attacks, the war created much coastal prosperity thanks to the huge expenditure on ship building during the war, with the South-West also becoming a centre for English piracy against foreign vessels. Metalworking continued to grow and in particular, pewter working which generated exports second only to cloth. By the 15th century pewter working in London was a large industry, with a hundred pewter workers recorded in London alone, and pewter working had also spread from London to eleven major cities across England. London goldsmithing remained significant but saw relatively little growth, with around 150 goldsmiths working in London during the period. Iron-working continued to expand and in 1509 the first cast iron cannon was made in England. This was reflected in the rapid growth in the number of iron-working guilds, from three in 1300 to fourteen by 1422.

The result was a substantial influx of money that in turn encouraged the import of manufactured luxury goods; by 1391 shipments from abroad routinely included "ivory, mirrors, paxes, armour, paper..., painted clothes, spectacles, tin images, razors, calamine, treacle, sugar-candy, marking irons, patens..., ox-horns and quantities of wainscot". Imported spices now formed a part of almost all noble and gentry diets, with the quantities being consumed varying according to the wealth of the household. The English government was also importing large quantities of raw materials, including copper, for manufacturing weapons. Many major landowners tended to focus their efforts on maintaining a single major castle or house rather than the dozens a century before, but these were usually decorated much more luxurious than previously. Major merchants' dwellings, too, were more lavish than in previous years.

==== Decline of the fair system ====
Towards the end of the 14th century, the position of fairs had begun to decline. The larger merchants, particularly in London, had begun to establish direct links with the larger landowners such as the nobility and the church; rather than the landowners buying from a chartered fair, they would buy directly from the merchant. Meanwhile, the growth of the indigenous England merchant class in the major cities, especially London, gradually crowded out the foreign merchants upon whom the great chartered fairs had largely depended. The crown's control over trade in the towns, especially the emerging newer towns towards the end of the 15th century that lacked central civic government, was increasingly weaker, making chartered status less relevant as more trade occurred from private properties and took place all year around. Nonetheless, the great fairs remained of importance well into the 15th century, as illustrated by their role in exchanging money, regional commerce and in providing choice for individual consumers.

== See also ==
- Taxation in medieval England
- History of the English penny (c. 600 – 1066)
- History of the English penny (1154–1485)

== Bibliography ==
- Aberth, John. (2001) From the Brink of the Apocalypse: Confronting Famine, War, Plague and Death in the Later Middle Ages. London: Routledge. ISBN 0-415-92715-3.
- Abulafia, David. (ed) (1999) The New Cambridge Medieval History: c. 1198-c. 1300. Cambridge: Cambridge University Press. ISBN 978-0-521-36289-4.
- Anderson, Michael. (ed) (1996) British Population History: From the Black Death to the Present Day. Cambridge: Cambridge University Press. ISBN 978-0-521-57884-4.
- Archer, Rowena E. and Simon Walker. (eds) (1995) Rulers and Ruled in Late Medieval England. London: Hambledon Press. ISBN 978-1-85285-133-0.
- Armstrong, Lawrin, Ivana Elbl and Martin M. Elbl. (eds) (2007) Money, Markets and Trade in Late Medieval Europe: Essays in Honour of John H. A. Munro. Leiden: BRILL. ISBN 978-90-04-15633-3.
- Astill, Grenville. (2000) "General Survey 600-1300," in Palliser (ed) 2000.
- Bailey, Mark. (1996) "Population and Economic Resources," in Given-Wilson (ed) 1996.
- Barron, Caroline. (2005) London in the Later Middle Ages: Government and People 1200-1500. Oxford: Oxford University Press. ISBN 978-0-19-928441-2.
- Blair, John and Nigel Ramsay. (eds) (2001) English Medieval Industries: Craftsmen, Techniques, Products. London: Hambledon Press. ISBN 978-1-85285-326-6.
- Britnell, Richard and John Hatcher (eds). (2002) Progress and Problems in Medieval England: Essays in Honour of Edward Miller. Cambridge: Cambridge University Press. ISBN 978-0-521-52273-1.
- Brown, Alfred L. (1989) The Governance of Late Medieval England, 1272-1461. Stanford: Stanford University Press. ISBN 978-0-8047-1730-4.
- Burton, Janet E. (1994) Monastic and Religious Orders in Britain, 1000-1300. Cambridge: Cambridge University Press. ISBN 978-0-521-37797-3.
- Cantor, Leonard (ed). (1982) The English Medieval Landscape. London: Croom Helm. ISBN 978-0-7099-0707-7.
- Cantor, Leonard. (1982a) "Introduction: the English Medieval Landscape," in Cantor (ed) 1982.
- Cooper, Alan. (2006) Bridges, Law and Power in Medieval England, 700-1400. Woodbridge, UK: Boydell Press. ISBN 978-1-84383-275-1.
- Danziger, Danny and John Gillingham. (2003) 1215: The Year of Magna Carta. London: Coronet Books. ISBN 978-0-7432-5778-7.
- Dobbin, Frank. (ed) (2004) The Sociology of the Economy. New York: Russell Sage Foundation. ISBN 978-0-87154-284-7.
- Douglas, David Charles. (1962) William the Conqueror: the Norman Impact upon England. Berkeley: University of California Press.
- Dyer, Christopher. (2009) Making a Living in the Middle Ages: The People of Britain, 850 - 1520. London: Yale University Press. ISBN 978-0-300-10191-1.
- Fletcher, Anthony and Diarmaid MacCulloch. (2008) Tudor Rebellions. Harlow, UK: Pearson Education. ISBN 978-1-4058-7432-8.
- Fryde, E. B. and Natalie Fryde. (1991) "Peasant Rebellion and Peasant Discontents," in Miller (ed) 1991.
- Geddes, Jane. (2001) "Iron," in Blair and Ramsay (eds) 2001.
- Given-Wilson, Chris (ed). (1996) An Illustrated History of Late Medieval England. Manchester: Manchester University Press. ISBN 978-0-7190-4152-5.
- Hamilton, J. S. (ed) (2006) Fourteenth Century England, Volume 4. Woodbridge, UK: Boydell Press. ISBN 978-1-84383-220-1.
- Harding, Alan. (1997) England in the Thirteenth Century. Cambridge: Cambridge University Press. ISBN 978-0-521-31612-5.
- Hatcher, John. (1996) "Plague, Population and the English Economy," in Anderson (ed) 1996.
- Hicks, Michael (eds). (2001) The Fifteenth Century 2: Revolution and Consumption in Late Medieval England. Woodbridge, UK: Boydell. ISBN 978-0-85115-832-7.
- Hillaby, Joe. (2003) "Jewish Colonisation in the Twelfth Century," in Skinner (ed) 2003.
- Hodgett, Gerald. (2006) A Social and Economic History of Medieval Europe. Abingdon, UK: Routledge. ISBN 978-0-415-37707-2.
- Homer, Ronald F. (2010) "Tin, Lead and Pewter," in Blair and Ramsay (eds) 2001.
- Jones, Dan. (2010) Summer of Blood: The Peasants' Revolt of 1381. London: Harper. ISBN 978-0-00-721393-1.
- Jordan, William Chester. (1997) The Great Famine: Northern Europe in the Early Fourteenth Century. Princeton: Princeton University Press. ISBN 978-0-691-05891-7.
- Kermode, Jenny. (1998) Medieval Merchants: York, Beverley and Hull in the Later Middle Ages. Cambridge: Cambridge University Press. ISBN 978-0-521-52274-8.
- Kowalski, Maryanne. (2007) "Warfare, Shipping, and Crown Patronage: The Economic Impact of the Hundred Years War on the English Port Towns," in Armstrong, Elbl and Elbl (eds) 2007.
- Lawler, John and Gail Gates Lawler. (2000) A Short Historical Introduction to the Law of Real Property. Washington DC: Beard Books. ISBN 978-1-58798-032-9.
- Lee, John. (2001) "The Trade of Fifteenth Century Cambridge and its Region," in Hicks (ed) 2001.
- McFarlane, Kenneth Bruce. (1981) England in the Fifteenth Century: Collected Essays. London: Hambledon Press. ISBN 978-0-907628-01-9.
- Miller, Edward. (ed) (1991) The Agrarian History of England and Wales, Volume III: 1348-1500. Cambridge: Cambridge University Press. ISBN 978-0-521-20074-5.
- Myers, A. R. (1971) England in the Late Middle Ages. Harmondsworth, UK: Penguin. ISBN 0-14-020234-X.
- Nightingale, Pamela. (2002) "The growth of London in the medieval English economy," in Britnell and Hatcher (eds) 2002.
- Palliser, D. M. (ed) (2000) The Cambridge Urban History of Britain: 600 - 1540, Volume 1. Cambridge: Cambridge University Press. ISBN 978-0-521-44461-3.
- Pilkinton, Mark Cartwright. (1997) Bristol. Toronto: University of Toronto Press. ISBN 978-0-8020-4221-7.
- Postan, M. M. (1942) "Some Social Consequences of the Hundred Years War," in Economic History Review, XII (1942).
- Postan, M. M. (1972) The Medieval Economy and Society. Harmondsworth, UK: Penguin. ISBN 0-14-020896-8.
- Pounds, Norman John Greville. (2005) The Medieval City. Westport, CT: Greenwood Press. ISBN 978-0-313-32498-7.
- Raban, Sandra. (2000) England Under Edward I and Edward II, 1259-1327. Oxford: Blackwell. ISBN 978-0-631-22320-7.
- Ramsay, Nigel. (2001) "Introduction," in Blair and Ramsay (eds) 2001.
- Reyerson, Kathryn L. (1999) "Commerce and communications," in Abulafia (ed) 1999.
- Richardson, Amanda. "Royal Landscapes," in Hamilton (ed) 2006.
- Skinner, Patricia (ed). (2003) The Jews in Medieval Britain: Historical, Literary, and Archaeological Perspectives. Woodbridge, UK: Boydell. ISBN 978-0-85115-931-7.
- Stacey, Robert C. (2003) "The English Jews under Henry III," in Skinner (ed) 2003.
- Stenton, Doris Mary. (1976) English Society in the Early Middle Ages (1066–1307). Harmondsworth, UK: Penguin. ISBN 0-14-020252-8.
- Swedberg, Richard. (2004) "On Legal Institutions and Their Role in the Economy," in Dobbin (ed) 2004.
- Tait, James. (1999) The Medieval English Borough: Studies on its Origins and Constitutional History. Manchester: Manchester University Press. ISBN 978-0-7190-0339-4.
- Wood, Diana. (2002) Medieval Economic Thought. Cambridge: Cambridge University Press. ISBN 978-0-521-45893-1.
- Woolgar, Christopher. (1995) "Diet and Consumption in Gentry and Noble Households: A Case Study from around the Wash," in Archer and Walker (eds) 1995.
