= Merrill Lynch Domestic Master =

The Merrill Lynch Domestic Master is a common American bond index, analogous to the S&P 500 for stocks, owned by Merrill Lynch. The Domestic Master is similar to the Salomon BIG or the Barclays Capital Aggregate Bond Index (The Agg). The Domestic Master Index was created on December 31, 1975. The index is re-balanced on the last calendar day of the month.

The Domestic Master Index (Ticker D0A0) is part of the larger Merrill Lynch US Broad Market (US00). The Domestic Master follows the US dollar denominated investment grade Public Corporate and Government debt. Treasuries, mortgage-backed securities, global bonds (debt issued simultaneously in the eurobond and US domestic bond markets) and some Yankee Bonds (debt of foreign issuers issued in the US domestic market) are included in the Domestic Master Index.

However, the Domestic Master index excludes asset-backed securities (ABS), tax-exempt municipal debt, 144As and any bond without a fixed coupon schedule, less than a $1 billion outstanding for US Treasuries and $150 million for all other securities, and less than one year remaining term to maturity.

== See also ==
- Bond market index
