= Trade reporting and compliance engine =

Trade reporting and compliance engine (TRACE), is a United States financial reporting regulation and related system for publicly reporting bond transactions.

Unlike company shares, which generally trade transparently on public exchanges, corporate bonds and structured products trade "over-the-counter", meaning they are private transactions between individual counterparties, and so the transactions were generally not publicly reported. To create better transparency into the bond market, the Securities and Exchange Commission under the Rule 6200 Series instituted the trade reporting and compliance engine (TRACE). TRACE has two major aspects:

- rules that describe which bond transactions must be publicly reported and when;
- a technology platform that gathers transaction data and makes it available to the public.

== History ==
Starting in 2001, and allowing a two-year comment period, the SEC published the TRACE rules, marking the first time many bond trades were subject to public reporting. The TRACE technology platform allows member firms of the Financial Industry Regulatory Authority (FINRA, formerly the National Association of Security Dealers, NASD) to report trades in fixed-income securities. It also allows the public to view and download market data, including prices and trade volume for corporate bonds and structured products, in some cases going back to 2009. The first phase of TRACE was implemented in July 2002.
