= Riccardi of Lucca =

The Riccardi of Lucca were a medieval merchant society in Lucca, Tuscany (in modern-day Italy). At their greatest extent, they had branches in Rome, Bordeaux, Paris, Flanders, London, York and Dublin.

== History ==
The Riccardi of Lucca had a long-term banking relationship with King Edward I of England between 1272 and 1307. Prior to 1272, the English kings had occasional dealings with Italian merchants, mainly in purchasing luxury goods for the household and arranging for balance transfers to Rome. The outbreak of war between England and France in 1294 led to a credit crunch in international money markets. When Edward sought financial support from the Riccardi, they were unable to advance him any funds. In response, Edward seized the Riccardi’s assets in England, effectively bankrupting them.

The Riccardi derived significant benefits from their connection to the English monarchy, such as using the King’s Exchequer Courts to pursue their debtors and special access to the English wool market. During the period when they were bankers to the English Crown, the Riccardi were involved in around half of all the forward contracts with English wool producers. Forward contract prices were calculated manually using techniques similar to those used in modern-day quantitative finance. When the relationship between the English Crown and Riccardi broke, England was unable to raise finance in international money markets and had to impose heavy levels of domestic taxation. These tax demands had wide repercussions on the 13th-century English economy and were one of the main causes of the constitutional crisis of 1297.
