= Non-corporate credit =

Non-Corporate Credit is a catch-all term used to include types of bonds that are forms of credit, but not issued by private corporations -— and therefore cannot be considered corporate debt. Non-Corporate Credit generally includes sovereign debt, regional governments and government agencies in a currency other than that of the issuer, and bonds issued by supranational entities.
