= Isaac of Norwich =

Isaac of Norwich or Isaac b. Eliab (c.1170–1235/6) was a moneylender, property owner and merchant who became one of the wealthiest Jews in England.

== Early life and prison ==
Little is known of Isaac's early years in Norwich, as his first recorded appearance is in 1194 on a loan contract in partnership with his parents. His father, Jurnet was a financier and prominent figure in Norwich's Jewish community, whom Isaac followed in his footsteps. Temporarily exiled from England in the 1180s, it is unknown if Isaac joined him on the continent. In 1189/90, a torrent of antisemitic violence swept across England, which resulted in multiple Jewish massacres. Isaac, in his teenage years, would have witnessed the dangers regarding his faith, as those in Norwich who did not take refuge in the castle risked their lives. Three years after entering a partnership with his parents, his father died, leaving Isaac eligible to inherit his estate for a fee of 1000 marks. He had two sons, Moses and Samuel, in the succeeding years before 1204, as he became a leading figure in the Norwich Jewish community.

This period of relative peace for English Jews, aided by King John's 1201 charter granting protection and privileges to England’s Jews, was short-lived, a common occurrence throughout the history of the Jews in England. Increasingly in need of funds throughout his reign, in 1210, King John had Jews imprisoned, Isaac among them. A tallage was imposed the same year on Jews as an extortionate means to extract substantial funds. Isaac negotiated a 10,000-mark fine, payable at 1 mark per day. As his wealth was confiscated, his properties were seized and granted to other officials. Imprisoned initially in Bristol, Isaac was transferred to the Tower of London in 1213, where he remained until his release in 1217.

== Later life ==
Upon his release, Isaac received a royal mandate granting him safe passage within the kingdom and permission to resume his previous business endeavors. He even received assistance in retrieving debts owed to him prior to his imprisonment. As Jewish moneylending was of such import to the crown, Isaac prospered in the early reign of Henry III. Isaac aggressively pursued the collection of debts from multiple debtors—dead or alive—appearing in multiple court cases seeking payment, sometimes from their heirs. From the Norwich Day Book, a compilation of 365 transactions between 1225 and 1227, currently residing at Westminster Abbey, it is revealed that Isaac is included in 87 of them. Reestablished, he owned property in Norwich and London and fostered relationships with royal officials, remaining one of the wealthiest Jews in England until his death.

== Isaac and the Antichrist ==
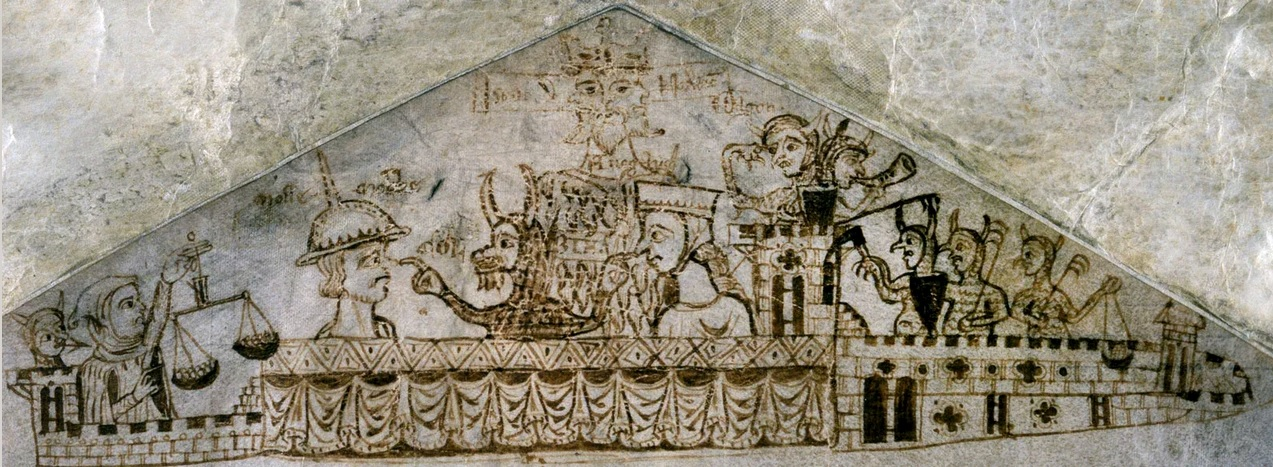
Depiction of Isaac of Norwich found in the Exchequer of Receipt of 1233 (crowned, three-faced caricature at the top).

Found in the Exchequer of Receipts of 1233 is the earliest surviving English antisemitic illustration of a Jewish figure. The artistic scribe responsible is anonymous, but Isaac is identified as the crowned caricature at the top of the drawing, as he is portrayed with three faces, each with pointed beards. These characteristics are often used to indicate an association with or likeness of the Antichrist. While the interpretation of the enacted scene below him—consisting of other identified Jewish people and demonic figures—is a matter of conjecture, scholars can agree that the drawing symbolizes Christian hostility towards Jews in the Middle Ages in linking them to the Devil.

== Bibliography ==
- Felsenstein, Frank. “Jews and Devils: Anti-Semitic Stereotypes of Late Medieval and Renaissance England.” Literature & theology, (1990): 15-28.
- Jacobs, Joseph. “Isaac of Norwich (Isaac b. Eliab).” The Jewish Encyclopedia. Accessed March 11, 2026. https://www.jewishencyclopedia.com/articles/8208-isaac-of-norwich-isaac-b-eliab
- Lipton, Sara. “Isaac and Antichrist in the Archives.” Past & Present 232, no. 1 (2016): 3–44.
- Tolan, John. “Chapter 1. Isaac of Norwich and the Rebuilding of the King's Jewry (1217-1222)” England's Jews: Finance, Violence, and the Crown in the Thirteenth Century. University of Pennsylvania Press, 2023.
- Rutledge, Elizabeth. “The Medieval Jews of Norwich and their Legacy.” In Art, Faith and Place in East Anglia: From Prehistory to the Present, edited by T. A. Heslop, Elizabeth Mellings, and Margit Thøfner, 117–29. Boydell & Brewer, 2012.
- Stacey, Robert C. “Isaac of Norwich.” In Oxford Dictionary of National Biography, edited by H.C.G. Matthew and Brian Harrison, vol. 41. 198-199. Oxford University Press 2004.
- "VI. Grant by John Bishop of Norwich to Ralph Roman of certain houses in Linne which had belonged to Isaac a Jew, of Norwich, at the request of King John. A. D. 1214". Camden. Old Series. 8: 61. 1839. doi:10.1017/S2042169900007938.
