= Federal budget of Russia =

Budget of the Russian federal government

The federal budget of Russia (Russian: федеральный бюджет России) is the leading element of the budget system of Russia. It is a major state financial plan for the fiscal year, which has the force of law after its approval by the Russian parliament and signed into law by the President of Russia.

The federal budget is the primary means of redistribution of national income and gross domestic product through it mobilized the financial resources necessary to regulate the country's economic development, social policy and the strengthening of the national defense. The share of federal budget accounts for a significant portion of the distribution process, which is the allocation of funds between sectors of the economy, manufacturing and industrial areas, regions of the country.

The right of the Russian Federation for an independent federal budget is enshrined by Article 71 of the Russian Constitution and the Budget Code of Russia that regulates the details of its formation and execution.

== Process ==
No later than October 1, the Russian government prepares and introduces a draft federal budget for the next fiscal year to the State Duma.

The federal budget is considered by the State Duma in three readings (amendments to the Code). At first reading, the basic parameters of the budget are adopted. According to the Budget Code, during the first reading of the State Duma has the right to increase revenues and the federal budget deficit, if these changes are not the endorsement of the government. The State Duma can reject the draft budget. In this case, a conciliation commission in conjunction with the government. In the second reading of the State Duma approves the budget section by section, and the third is on the budget law as a whole. Following the adoption of the State Duma the federal budget, the law goes to the Federation Council, the upper house of the parliament, and then signed into law by the President.

== Structure ==
Difficulties in implementing fiscal reforms aimed at raising government revenues and a dependence on short-term borrowing to finance budget deficits led to a serious financial crisis in 1998. The Russian economy bounced back quickly from the 1998 crisis and enjoyed over 9 years of sustained growth averaging about 7% due to a devalued ruble, implementation of key economic reforms (taxation, banking, labor and land codes), tight fiscal policy, and favorable commodities prices.

== Data by decade ==
=== 2000–2009 ===
Russia ran a budget surplus from 2001 to 2008 when a financial crisis occurred.

Although the government revised its budget projections during 2009 to reflect lower oil prices and the effects of the economic crisis, it ended the year with a budget deficit amounting to 7.9% of GDP, which it financed from the Reserve Fund, one of the government's two stabilization funds. The government's anti-crisis package in 2008 and 2009 amounted to about 6.7% of GDP, according to World Bank estimates. The package provided support to the financial sector and enterprises through liquidity injections to banks and tax cuts/fiscal support to enterprises as well as modest support for households and small and medium enterprises and increased unemployment benefits.

The highest rate of increased fiscal revenues associated with the production and export of mineral resources (tax on mineral extraction, oil export duties, etc.). In particular, the 2008 federal budget of Russia was formed on 50% oil and gas revenues (in 2006 the share of oil and gas revenues accounted for more than half, in 2003 it accounted for a quarter of the total income).

=== 2010–2019 ===
In 2016, the Russian budget deficit reached $21 billion. It was expected to rise to $21.7 billion in the year. 2016 budget revenues were estimated to be 13.7 trillion rubles (200 billion US dollars) or 17.5% of GDP, while spending is planned to be 16 trillion rubles (roughly 233 billion dollars) or 20.5% of GDP. The budget deficit is thus 2.35 trillion rubles (33 billion dollars) or 3% of GDP.

=== 2020–present ===
In 2021 the budget was set:

- 2022 Revenues 25.2 trillion rubles ($341 billion). Expenses 23.6 trillion rubles ($325.8 billion). Surplus 1.4 trillion rubles ($15.2 billion)
- 2023 Revenues 25.5 trillion rubles ($349 billion). Expenses 25.1 trillion rubles ($343 billion). Surplus 0.4 trillion rubles ($5.9 billion)
- 2024 Revenues 25.8 trillion rubles ($352 billion). Expenses 26.1 trillion rubles ($357 billion). Deficit 0.3 trillion rubles ($4.3 billion)

As of autumn 2022 Russia was estimated to possess nearly $549 billion in foreign exchange reserves, but some 50% of that total has been frozen by foreign countries friendly to Ukraine. In 2021, the federal budget totalled to $340 billion. As a result of the international sanctions during the Russo-Ukrainian War, budgetary shortfalls would normally need to be covered by the Russian National Wealth Fund, said Finance Minister Anton Siluanov.

In 2023, the Russian finance minister stated that the planned surplus of 1.4 trillion rubles from the 2022 budget had become a 3.3 trillion ruble deficit over the same period. In addition, the Russian finance minister reported in April that the deficit in the first quarter of 2023 was 2.4 trillion against the expected yearly surplus of 0.4 trillion rubles. Alex Isakov forecasts the 2023 expenditures to be 31 trillion rubles, with a deficit of 6.9 trillion. The declared results to June 2023 shows a budget deficit of 2.59 trillion rubles ($28 billion).

With the ongoing invasion of Ukraine, military and defense expenditures have risen and taken increasingly large proportions of the federal budget. In 2024, the federal budget allocated around 30% of total expenditures for defense and security, a nearly 70% increase from the 2023 budget.

== See also ==
- Account Chamber of Russia
- Military budget of Russia
- Russian National Wealth Fund
