= Barbell strategy =

Financial investment strategy

In finance, a barbell strategy is formed when a trader invests in long- and short-duration bonds, but does not invest in intermediate-duration bonds. This strategy is useful when interest rates are rising; as the short term maturities are rolled over they receive a higher interest rate, raising the value. A contrasting strategy is the bullet strategy, which involves investing only in intermediate-term bonds.

== Concept ==
A barbell strategy is one of several different types of portfolio strategies that is designed to create a reasonable return on the investments that are part of the asset portfolio. The barbell strategy is built around the concept of focusing on the maturities of the securities in the portfolio by making sure the maturity dates are either very close or at a distant date. It is similar to the laddered approach.

== Application ==
The key to employing a barbell strategy is seeking to include bonds and other securities set to mature either in the short term or the long term. While it is always a good idea to include a mix of investments with a variety of maturation dates, this approach concentrates those dates at opposite ends of the spectrum. This means that two blocks or groups are created within the portfolio, rather than having securities that mature consistently from one period to the next.

== Benefits ==
The barbell strategy allows for a quick turnover of a significant amount of the assets in the portfolio at one time. For example, attention should be paid to the block of short-term investments, so they can all be rolled over into new short-term investments as they reach maturity. Typically, this leads to an increase in the value of the investments that are turned over, thus increasing the overall value of the investment portfolio.

== Theoretical results ==
Under simplistic assumptions about forward rates, a bar-bell portfolio comprising only the shortest dated bond and the longest on offer has been shown to maximize modified excess return.

== Variations ==
One variation of the barbell strategy involves investing 90% of one's assets in extremely safe instruments, such as treasury bills, with the remaining 10% being used to make diversified, speculative bets that have massive payoff potential. In other words, the strategy caps the maximum loss at 10%, while still providing exposure to huge upside. This strategy works best during periods of high inflation for three reasons: High interest rates make put options cheaper in accordance to the Black Scholes option pricing formula, stock crashes have historically occurred during periods of high interest rates (1987, 1998, 2000, 2007, etc.), and a high interest rate helps finance the trader's bankroll for when the market doesn't crash, which is most of the time. With interest rates still at zero, this strategy is much less effective. Thirty-year bonds pay more, but are volatile. Foreign and corporate bonds are also quite volatile and far from risk-free.
