= Bullet strategy =

In finance, a bullet strategy is followed by a trader investing in intermediate-duration bonds, but not in long- and short-duration bonds.

The bullet strategy is based on the acquisition of a number of different types of securities over an extended period of time, but with all the securities maturing around the same target date. One of the main benefits of the bullet strategy is that it allows the investor to minimize the impact of fluctuations in the interest rate, while still realizing excellent returns on the investments.

== Advantages ==
Bullet strategies are relatively simple to implement and construct. The first step is to determine at what point on the yield curve the series of investments should mature. This will help lead to the incremental acquisition of additions to the portfolio that will reach maturity on the same target date. Staggering the acquisition dates of the assets means that the risk associated with interest rates is diluted. The investor is able to pick up good deals on various bonds and other securities along the way, arranging the maturities to coincide with the desired final date.

One of the advantages of the bullet strategy is that the investments are acquired and then set aside until the maturity date arrives. Of course, this means that the funds used to acquire the securities should not be used until the date of maturity. However, for people who are thinking in terms of creating a windfall in revenue at a given point in time, this approach is an excellent solution. The earnings realized from the bullet strategy may be used to make final payments on property, handle a balloon payment that is due, or fund a college education.

The bullet strategy can be composed of any number of different types of bonds and other securities. With no limit on the number of assets that can be employed as part of this investment scheme, it is possible for the investor to gradually accumulate all the assets needed to ensure the level of return that is desired at a certain point in time. Both small investors as well as investors who deal in major stocks and bonds can employ the bullet strategy, and create an attractive return for the investment.

== Alternatives ==
By comparison, in a barbell strategy the maturity of the bonds included in the portfolio is concentrated at two extreme maturities, while in the strategy referred to as laddering or ladder strategy the portfolio is constructed to have approximately equal amounts of each maturity.

== See also ==
- Barbell strategy
- Laddering
