= Bond market index =

Method of measuring the performance of the bond market

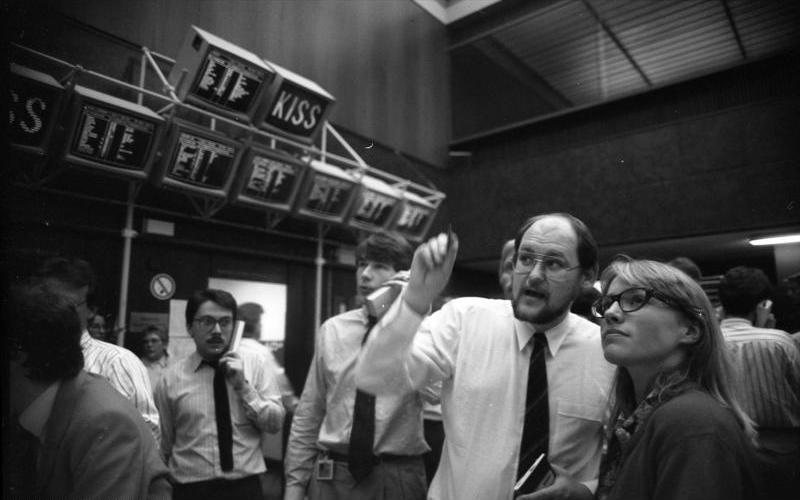
The Frankfurt Bond Market, 1988

A bond index or bond market index is an index that measures the investment performance and other characteristics of the bond market. There are numerous indices of differing construction that are designed to measure the aggregate bond market and its various sectors (government, municipal, corporate, etc.) A bond index is computed from the change in market prices and, in the case of a total return index, the interest payments, associated with selected bonds over a specified period of time. Bond indices are used by investors and portfolio managers as a benchmark against which to measure the performance of actively managed bond portfolios, which attempt to outperform the index, and passively managed bond portfolios, that are designed to match the performance of the index. Bond indices are also used in determining the compensation of those who manage bond portfolios on a performance-fee basis.

An index is a mathematical construct, so it may not be invested in directly. But many mutual funds and exchange-traded funds attempt to "track" an index (see index fund), and those funds that do not may be judged against those that do.

== History ==
Total return bond indices were first developed in the 1970s, at which point they measured only U.S. investment grade bonds. The investment bank Kuhn, Loeb & Co is often credited with the creation of the first bond indices under its head of fixed income research Arthur 'Art' Lipson. Salomon Brothers also began creating bond indices around this time. The original Kuhn Loeb bond index has since changed ownership to Lehman Brothers in 1977, Barclays in 2008 and most recently Bloomberg in 2015.

The first index fund to track a bond index was the Vanguard Total Bond Market Index Fund, launched in 1986 to track this Lehman Brothers Aggregate Bond index.

Indices for high-yield (below investment grade) U.S. bonds and non-U.S. government bonds were developed in the mid-1980s. During this period it became increasingly apparent that most portfolio managers were unable to outperform the bond market. This resulted in the development of passively managed bond index funds, and the proliferation of indices themselves.

== Characteristics ==
Characteristics that are relevant in judging bond indices include:

- The sample of securities: the number of securities in the index, and the criteria used to determine the specific bonds included in the index.
- Market sector measured: indices can be composed of government bonds, municipal bonds, investment grade corporate bonds, below-investment-grade (high-yield bonds), mortgage-backed securities, syndicated or leveraged loans. Indices may also consist of bonds within a certain range of maturities, e.g. long term, intermediate term, etc.
- Weighting of returns: the impact of each individual issue's return on the overall index may be weighted by market capitalization (the market value of the security), or equal-weighted for each security. Most bond indices are weighted by market capitalization. This results in the "bums" problem, in which less creditworthy issuers with a lot of outstanding debt constitute a larger part of the index than more creditworthy ones with less debt.
- Quality of price data: the market price used for each bond in the index may be based on actual transactions, a brokerage firm's estimate or a computer model.
- Reinvestment assumptions: what does the rate of return calculation assume regarding reinvestment of periodic interest payments from the bonds in the index?

There are certain challenges inherent in constructing and maintaining a bond market index:

- The bond market contains more individual securities than the stock market. A corporation which qualifies for inclusion in a particular bond index may have multiple bonds outstanding.
- Most bonds are traded in a fragmented over-the-counter market that has no consolidated price quotation system. Therefore, unlike the stock market, there is no single source to consult to determine the definitive closing price of each bond in the index on any given day.
- An individual bond's duration changes with the passage of time remaining until maturity. This changes the index's price sensitivity to a given change in yield, even if the bonds comprising the index remain constant. A bond's convexity and the value of any embedded options (e.g. call provisions) also change over time.

== Indices and passive investment management ==
Investment companies develop and market passively managed fixed income mutual funds which are designed to match the performance of a particular bond index. In selecting such a fund, risk tolerance is a key consideration. Funds which match indices that include corporate bonds will expose the investor to credit risk, particularly if below-investment-grade corporate bonds are involved. If that risk is unacceptable, the investor should avoid a fund that includes these sectors.

Usually, passive portfolio managers purchase a subset of the issues included in their benchmark index. But their portfolio's performance is measured against the entire index. Since bond indices typically contain more securities than stock indices, passive bond fund managers face a more difficult task than their stock index fund counterparts with respect matching the performance of their benchmark. Often the average duration of the market may not be the most appropriate duration for a given portfolio. Replication of an index's characteristics can be achieved by using bond futures to match the duration of the bond index.

Broker/dealer firms have created their own proprietary bond market indices. These indices can create new sources of revenue for the firm. The creator of the index will charge a fee for providing the index information needed to set up and rebalance a portfolio tied to its proprietary index, but also expect their clients to use their trading desk to execute the bulk of the transactions.

Investment managers sometimes create customized indices designed to meet a client's requirements and long-term investment goals. For example, in 1986 Salomon Brothers introduced a bond index designed specifically for large pension funds "seeking to establish core portfolios that more closely match the longer durations of their nominal dollar liabilities".

As of 2026, index strategies accounted for 40% of fixed income fund assets in the U.S.

== See also ==
- Bond fund
- Financial risk management § Investment management
- List of bond market indices
- Stock market index
- Index (economics)
- Index fund
- Index investing
- Passive management
